

508001–508100 

|-bgcolor=#fefefe
| 508001 ||  || — || January 15, 2008 || Kitt Peak || Spacewatch ||  || align=right data-sort-value="0.57" | 570 m || 
|-id=002 bgcolor=#fefefe
| 508002 ||  || — || March 13, 2008 || Kitt Peak || Spacewatch || V || align=right data-sort-value="0.58" | 580 m || 
|-id=003 bgcolor=#fefefe
| 508003 ||  || — || December 18, 2007 || Mount Lemmon || Mount Lemmon Survey ||  || align=right data-sort-value="0.65" | 650 m || 
|-id=004 bgcolor=#E9E9E9
| 508004 ||  || — || February 1, 2006 || Mount Lemmon || Mount Lemmon Survey ||  || align=right | 2.1 km || 
|-id=005 bgcolor=#E9E9E9
| 508005 ||  || — || August 22, 2004 || Kitt Peak || Spacewatch ||  || align=right | 1.3 km || 
|-id=006 bgcolor=#fefefe
| 508006 ||  || — || November 11, 2006 || Mount Lemmon || Mount Lemmon Survey || NYS || align=right data-sort-value="0.59" | 590 m || 
|-id=007 bgcolor=#fefefe
| 508007 ||  || — || December 26, 2006 || Kitt Peak || Spacewatch || NYS || align=right data-sort-value="0.61" | 610 m || 
|-id=008 bgcolor=#E9E9E9
| 508008 ||  || — || April 29, 2003 || Kitt Peak || Spacewatch ||  || align=right data-sort-value="0.98" | 980 m || 
|-id=009 bgcolor=#E9E9E9
| 508009 ||  || — || January 19, 2015 || Haleakala || Pan-STARRS ||  || align=right | 2.0 km || 
|-id=010 bgcolor=#E9E9E9
| 508010 ||  || — || October 5, 2012 || Mount Lemmon || Mount Lemmon Survey ||  || align=right | 2.1 km || 
|-id=011 bgcolor=#fefefe
| 508011 ||  || — || September 11, 2010 || Kitt Peak || Spacewatch ||  || align=right data-sort-value="0.66" | 660 m || 
|-id=012 bgcolor=#fefefe
| 508012 ||  || — || September 18, 2006 || Catalina || CSS ||  || align=right data-sort-value="0.74" | 740 m || 
|-id=013 bgcolor=#fefefe
| 508013 ||  || — || January 13, 2008 || Kitt Peak || Spacewatch ||  || align=right data-sort-value="0.62" | 620 m || 
|-id=014 bgcolor=#fefefe
| 508014 ||  || — || April 6, 2000 || Socorro || LINEAR ||  || align=right data-sort-value="0.74" | 740 m || 
|-id=015 bgcolor=#E9E9E9
| 508015 ||  || — || June 16, 2012 || Haleakala || Pan-STARRS ||  || align=right | 2.5 km || 
|-id=016 bgcolor=#fefefe
| 508016 ||  || — || December 15, 2004 || Kitt Peak || Spacewatch ||  || align=right data-sort-value="0.62" | 620 m || 
|-id=017 bgcolor=#E9E9E9
| 508017 ||  || — || November 28, 2013 || Mount Lemmon || Mount Lemmon Survey ||  || align=right | 2.1 km || 
|-id=018 bgcolor=#E9E9E9
| 508018 ||  || — || May 7, 2007 || Kitt Peak || Spacewatch ||  || align=right | 1.4 km || 
|-id=019 bgcolor=#fefefe
| 508019 ||  || — || July 15, 2013 || Haleakala || Pan-STARRS ||  || align=right | 1.0 km || 
|-id=020 bgcolor=#fefefe
| 508020 ||  || — || September 20, 2009 || Kitt Peak || Spacewatch ||  || align=right data-sort-value="0.94" | 940 m || 
|-id=021 bgcolor=#fefefe
| 508021 ||  || — || December 3, 2010 || Mount Lemmon || Mount Lemmon Survey || V || align=right data-sort-value="0.55" | 550 m || 
|-id=022 bgcolor=#fefefe
| 508022 ||  || — || September 20, 2003 || Kitt Peak || Spacewatch ||  || align=right data-sort-value="0.68" | 680 m || 
|-id=023 bgcolor=#E9E9E9
| 508023 ||  || — || October 28, 2005 || Mount Lemmon || Mount Lemmon Survey ||  || align=right data-sort-value="0.87" | 870 m || 
|-id=024 bgcolor=#E9E9E9
| 508024 ||  || — || September 4, 2008 || Kitt Peak || Spacewatch ||  || align=right data-sort-value="0.94" | 940 m || 
|-id=025 bgcolor=#E9E9E9
| 508025 ||  || — || October 24, 2009 || Mount Lemmon || Mount Lemmon Survey ||  || align=right | 1.2 km || 
|-id=026 bgcolor=#fefefe
| 508026 ||  || — || March 31, 2008 || Mount Lemmon || Mount Lemmon Survey ||  || align=right data-sort-value="0.61" | 610 m || 
|-id=027 bgcolor=#fefefe
| 508027 ||  || — || February 12, 2004 || Kitt Peak || Spacewatch || MAS || align=right data-sort-value="0.49" | 490 m || 
|-id=028 bgcolor=#E9E9E9
| 508028 ||  || — || July 1, 2008 || Kitt Peak || Spacewatch ||  || align=right | 1.00 km || 
|-id=029 bgcolor=#E9E9E9
| 508029 ||  || — || January 7, 2006 || Mount Lemmon || Mount Lemmon Survey ||  || align=right | 2.1 km || 
|-id=030 bgcolor=#fefefe
| 508030 ||  || — || January 30, 2011 || Haleakala || Pan-STARRS ||  || align=right data-sort-value="0.63" | 630 m || 
|-id=031 bgcolor=#fefefe
| 508031 ||  || — || March 12, 2008 || Kitt Peak || Spacewatch ||  || align=right data-sort-value="0.72" | 720 m || 
|-id=032 bgcolor=#E9E9E9
| 508032 ||  || — || January 25, 2006 || Kitt Peak || Spacewatch ||  || align=right | 1.7 km || 
|-id=033 bgcolor=#d6d6d6
| 508033 ||  || — || January 11, 2010 || Kitt Peak || Spacewatch ||  || align=right | 2.7 km || 
|-id=034 bgcolor=#fefefe
| 508034 ||  || — || January 30, 2011 || Haleakala || Pan-STARRS ||  || align=right data-sort-value="0.79" | 790 m || 
|-id=035 bgcolor=#fefefe
| 508035 ||  || — || April 1, 2012 || Mount Lemmon || Mount Lemmon Survey ||  || align=right data-sort-value="0.95" | 950 m || 
|-id=036 bgcolor=#fefefe
| 508036 ||  || — || May 29, 2008 || Kitt Peak || Spacewatch ||  || align=right data-sort-value="0.84" | 840 m || 
|-id=037 bgcolor=#fefefe
| 508037 ||  || — || November 15, 2007 || Mount Lemmon || Mount Lemmon Survey ||  || align=right data-sort-value="0.55" | 550 m || 
|-id=038 bgcolor=#E9E9E9
| 508038 ||  || — || January 27, 2006 || Mount Lemmon || Mount Lemmon Survey ||  || align=right | 2.3 km || 
|-id=039 bgcolor=#fefefe
| 508039 ||  || — || December 30, 2007 || Kitt Peak || Spacewatch ||  || align=right data-sort-value="0.45" | 450 m || 
|-id=040 bgcolor=#E9E9E9
| 508040 ||  || — || September 3, 2008 || La Sagra || OAM Obs. ||  || align=right | 1.8 km || 
|-id=041 bgcolor=#E9E9E9
| 508041 ||  || — || January 23, 2015 || Haleakala || Pan-STARRS ||  || align=right | 1.7 km || 
|-id=042 bgcolor=#d6d6d6
| 508042 ||  || — || February 10, 2014 || Mount Lemmon || Mount Lemmon Survey ||  || align=right | 2.5 km || 
|-id=043 bgcolor=#d6d6d6
| 508043 ||  || — || February 9, 2008 || Kitt Peak || Spacewatch || 7:4 || align=right | 3.9 km || 
|-id=044 bgcolor=#E9E9E9
| 508044 ||  || — || October 21, 2008 || Mount Lemmon || Mount Lemmon Survey ||  || align=right | 2.2 km || 
|-id=045 bgcolor=#fefefe
| 508045 ||  || — || November 5, 2010 || Mount Lemmon || Mount Lemmon Survey ||  || align=right data-sort-value="0.91" | 910 m || 
|-id=046 bgcolor=#E9E9E9
| 508046 ||  || — || August 14, 2013 || Haleakala || Pan-STARRS ||  || align=right data-sort-value="0.89" | 890 m || 
|-id=047 bgcolor=#E9E9E9
| 508047 ||  || — || January 20, 2015 || Haleakala || Pan-STARRS ||  || align=right | 1.1 km || 
|-id=048 bgcolor=#E9E9E9
| 508048 ||  || — || November 9, 2013 || Mount Lemmon || Mount Lemmon Survey ||  || align=right data-sort-value="0.96" | 960 m || 
|-id=049 bgcolor=#E9E9E9
| 508049 ||  || — || July 30, 2008 || Catalina || CSS ||  || align=right | 1.4 km || 
|-id=050 bgcolor=#E9E9E9
| 508050 ||  || — || November 28, 2013 || Mount Lemmon || Mount Lemmon Survey ||  || align=right | 1.4 km || 
|-id=051 bgcolor=#fefefe
| 508051 ||  || — || September 14, 2013 || Haleakala || Pan-STARRS ||  || align=right | 1.0 km || 
|-id=052 bgcolor=#fefefe
| 508052 ||  || — || November 25, 2005 || Mount Lemmon || Mount Lemmon Survey ||  || align=right | 1.0 km || 
|-id=053 bgcolor=#E9E9E9
| 508053 ||  || — || March 27, 2011 || Mount Lemmon || Mount Lemmon Survey ||  || align=right | 1.3 km || 
|-id=054 bgcolor=#E9E9E9
| 508054 ||  || — || January 27, 2006 || Kitt Peak || Spacewatch ||  || align=right | 1.4 km || 
|-id=055 bgcolor=#E9E9E9
| 508055 ||  || — || February 7, 2006 || Kitt Peak || Spacewatch ||  || align=right | 1.6 km || 
|-id=056 bgcolor=#E9E9E9
| 508056 ||  || — || April 2, 2006 || Kitt Peak || Spacewatch ||  || align=right | 1.7 km || 
|-id=057 bgcolor=#E9E9E9
| 508057 ||  || — || March 20, 2010 || Mount Lemmon || Mount Lemmon Survey ||  || align=right | 2.8 km || 
|-id=058 bgcolor=#fefefe
| 508058 ||  || — || April 1, 2005 || Kitt Peak || Spacewatch ||  || align=right data-sort-value="0.65" | 650 m || 
|-id=059 bgcolor=#E9E9E9
| 508059 ||  || — || April 2, 2011 || Haleakala || Pan-STARRS ||  || align=right | 1.8 km || 
|-id=060 bgcolor=#E9E9E9
| 508060 ||  || — || January 28, 2015 || Haleakala || Pan-STARRS ||  || align=right | 2.1 km || 
|-id=061 bgcolor=#fefefe
| 508061 ||  || — || February 16, 2001 || Kitt Peak || Spacewatch ||  || align=right data-sort-value="0.59" | 590 m || 
|-id=062 bgcolor=#d6d6d6
| 508062 ||  || — || January 20, 2015 || Haleakala || Pan-STARRS ||  || align=right | 2.7 km || 
|-id=063 bgcolor=#fefefe
| 508063 ||  || — || September 25, 2006 || Kitt Peak || Spacewatch ||  || align=right data-sort-value="0.87" | 870 m || 
|-id=064 bgcolor=#fefefe
| 508064 ||  || — || August 15, 2009 || Kitt Peak || Spacewatch ||  || align=right data-sort-value="0.73" | 730 m || 
|-id=065 bgcolor=#fefefe
| 508065 ||  || — || April 21, 2004 || Kitt Peak || Spacewatch ||  || align=right data-sort-value="0.75" | 750 m || 
|-id=066 bgcolor=#fefefe
| 508066 ||  || — || March 4, 2008 || Mount Lemmon || Mount Lemmon Survey ||  || align=right data-sort-value="0.63" | 630 m || 
|-id=067 bgcolor=#fefefe
| 508067 ||  || — || April 15, 2008 || Mount Lemmon || Mount Lemmon Survey ||  || align=right data-sort-value="0.79" | 790 m || 
|-id=068 bgcolor=#fefefe
| 508068 ||  || — || November 26, 2010 || Mount Lemmon || Mount Lemmon Survey ||  || align=right data-sort-value="0.66" | 660 m || 
|-id=069 bgcolor=#fefefe
| 508069 ||  || — || March 11, 2005 || Kitt Peak || Spacewatch ||  || align=right data-sort-value="0.85" | 850 m || 
|-id=070 bgcolor=#E9E9E9
| 508070 ||  || — || April 20, 2007 || Kitt Peak || Spacewatch ||  || align=right | 1.3 km || 
|-id=071 bgcolor=#fefefe
| 508071 ||  || — || September 12, 2005 || Kitt Peak || Spacewatch ||  || align=right data-sort-value="0.85" | 850 m || 
|-id=072 bgcolor=#E9E9E9
| 508072 ||  || — || March 11, 2011 || Kitt Peak || Spacewatch ||  || align=right data-sort-value="0.88" | 880 m || 
|-id=073 bgcolor=#fefefe
| 508073 ||  || — || June 13, 2012 || Haleakala || Pan-STARRS ||  || align=right data-sort-value="0.61" | 610 m || 
|-id=074 bgcolor=#fefefe
| 508074 ||  || — || May 20, 2012 || Mount Lemmon || Mount Lemmon Survey ||  || align=right data-sort-value="0.89" | 890 m || 
|-id=075 bgcolor=#fefefe
| 508075 ||  || — || May 14, 2008 || Mount Lemmon || Mount Lemmon Survey ||  || align=right data-sort-value="0.89" | 890 m || 
|-id=076 bgcolor=#fefefe
| 508076 ||  || — || September 18, 2003 || Kitt Peak || Spacewatch ||  || align=right data-sort-value="0.88" | 880 m || 
|-id=077 bgcolor=#E9E9E9
| 508077 ||  || — || February 16, 2015 || Haleakala || Pan-STARRS ||  || align=right | 1.2 km || 
|-id=078 bgcolor=#E9E9E9
| 508078 ||  || — || October 3, 2013 || Mount Lemmon || Mount Lemmon Survey ||  || align=right | 2.1 km || 
|-id=079 bgcolor=#d6d6d6
| 508079 ||  || — || September 13, 2007 || Mount Lemmon || Mount Lemmon Survey ||  || align=right | 2.3 km || 
|-id=080 bgcolor=#E9E9E9
| 508080 ||  || — || August 10, 2012 || Kitt Peak || Spacewatch ||  || align=right | 1.8 km || 
|-id=081 bgcolor=#E9E9E9
| 508081 ||  || — || January 28, 2007 || Mount Lemmon || Mount Lemmon Survey ||  || align=right data-sort-value="0.82" | 820 m || 
|-id=082 bgcolor=#fefefe
| 508082 ||  || — || January 30, 2011 || Haleakala || Pan-STARRS ||  || align=right data-sort-value="0.80" | 800 m || 
|-id=083 bgcolor=#fefefe
| 508083 ||  || — || January 10, 2008 || Mount Lemmon || Mount Lemmon Survey ||  || align=right data-sort-value="0.48" | 480 m || 
|-id=084 bgcolor=#fefefe
| 508084 ||  || — || September 24, 2013 || Mount Lemmon || Mount Lemmon Survey ||  || align=right data-sort-value="0.86" | 860 m || 
|-id=085 bgcolor=#fefefe
| 508085 ||  || — || February 12, 2004 || Kitt Peak || Spacewatch ||  || align=right data-sort-value="0.53" | 530 m || 
|-id=086 bgcolor=#E9E9E9
| 508086 ||  || — || April 27, 2011 || Haleakala || Pan-STARRS ||  || align=right | 2.0 km || 
|-id=087 bgcolor=#E9E9E9
| 508087 ||  || — || November 21, 2009 || Mount Lemmon || Mount Lemmon Survey ||  || align=right | 2.4 km || 
|-id=088 bgcolor=#fefefe
| 508088 ||  || — || November 10, 2010 || Mount Lemmon || Mount Lemmon Survey || V || align=right data-sort-value="0.46" | 460 m || 
|-id=089 bgcolor=#fefefe
| 508089 ||  || — || March 29, 2008 || Kitt Peak || Spacewatch ||  || align=right data-sort-value="0.71" | 710 m || 
|-id=090 bgcolor=#E9E9E9
| 508090 ||  || — || August 21, 2004 || Siding Spring || SSS ||  || align=right | 1.3 km || 
|-id=091 bgcolor=#E9E9E9
| 508091 ||  || — || November 1, 2013 || Catalina || CSS || MAR || align=right | 1.2 km || 
|-id=092 bgcolor=#E9E9E9
| 508092 ||  || — || September 25, 2008 || Mount Lemmon || Mount Lemmon Survey ||  || align=right | 2.2 km || 
|-id=093 bgcolor=#E9E9E9
| 508093 ||  || — || October 9, 2012 || Haleakala || Pan-STARRS ||  || align=right | 2.3 km || 
|-id=094 bgcolor=#E9E9E9
| 508094 ||  || — || September 5, 2008 || Kitt Peak || Spacewatch ||  || align=right | 1.5 km || 
|-id=095 bgcolor=#E9E9E9
| 508095 ||  || — || November 11, 2009 || Kitt Peak || Spacewatch || EUN || align=right | 1.1 km || 
|-id=096 bgcolor=#E9E9E9
| 508096 ||  || — || March 17, 2007 || Kitt Peak || Spacewatch ||  || align=right data-sort-value="0.97" | 970 m || 
|-id=097 bgcolor=#d6d6d6
| 508097 ||  || — || February 26, 2010 || WISE || WISE ||  || align=right | 3.9 km || 
|-id=098 bgcolor=#fefefe
| 508098 ||  || — || September 17, 2010 || Mount Lemmon || Mount Lemmon Survey ||  || align=right data-sort-value="0.69" | 690 m || 
|-id=099 bgcolor=#fefefe
| 508099 ||  || — || October 17, 2010 || Mount Lemmon || Mount Lemmon Survey ||  || align=right data-sort-value="0.56" | 560 m || 
|-id=100 bgcolor=#E9E9E9
| 508100 ||  || — || March 27, 2011 || Mount Lemmon || Mount Lemmon Survey ||  || align=right data-sort-value="0.79" | 790 m || 
|}

508101–508200 

|-bgcolor=#fefefe
| 508101 ||  || — || December 18, 2003 || Socorro || LINEAR ||  || align=right data-sort-value="0.82" | 820 m || 
|-id=102 bgcolor=#fefefe
| 508102 ||  || — || February 10, 2008 || Mount Lemmon || Mount Lemmon Survey ||  || align=right data-sort-value="0.47" | 470 m || 
|-id=103 bgcolor=#fefefe
| 508103 ||  || — || October 13, 2007 || Kitt Peak || Spacewatch ||  || align=right data-sort-value="0.71" | 710 m || 
|-id=104 bgcolor=#E9E9E9
| 508104 ||  || — || February 26, 2007 || Mount Lemmon || Mount Lemmon Survey ||  || align=right data-sort-value="0.70" | 700 m || 
|-id=105 bgcolor=#fefefe
| 508105 ||  || — || March 9, 2005 || Mount Lemmon || Mount Lemmon Survey ||  || align=right data-sort-value="0.64" | 640 m || 
|-id=106 bgcolor=#E9E9E9
| 508106 ||  || — || February 18, 2015 || Haleakala || Pan-STARRS ||  || align=right | 1.8 km || 
|-id=107 bgcolor=#E9E9E9
| 508107 ||  || — || October 10, 2012 || Mount Lemmon || Mount Lemmon Survey ||  || align=right | 2.4 km || 
|-id=108 bgcolor=#fefefe
| 508108 ||  || — || March 18, 2004 || Kitt Peak || Spacewatch ||  || align=right data-sort-value="0.97" | 970 m || 
|-id=109 bgcolor=#E9E9E9
| 508109 ||  || — || July 13, 2013 || Haleakala || Pan-STARRS ||  || align=right | 1.3 km || 
|-id=110 bgcolor=#E9E9E9
| 508110 ||  || — || December 18, 2009 || Kitt Peak || Spacewatch ||  || align=right | 2.7 km || 
|-id=111 bgcolor=#d6d6d6
| 508111 ||  || — || June 15, 2005 || Mount Lemmon || Mount Lemmon Survey ||  || align=right | 3.7 km || 
|-id=112 bgcolor=#E9E9E9
| 508112 ||  || — || September 24, 2008 || Socorro || LINEAR ||  || align=right | 1.6 km || 
|-id=113 bgcolor=#E9E9E9
| 508113 ||  || — || February 23, 2015 || Haleakala || Pan-STARRS ||  || align=right | 1.5 km || 
|-id=114 bgcolor=#d6d6d6
| 508114 ||  || — || November 13, 2007 || Mount Lemmon || Mount Lemmon Survey ||  || align=right | 2.8 km || 
|-id=115 bgcolor=#E9E9E9
| 508115 ||  || — || September 4, 2007 || Mount Lemmon || Mount Lemmon Survey ||  || align=right | 2.3 km || 
|-id=116 bgcolor=#d6d6d6
| 508116 ||  || — || September 25, 2011 || Haleakala || Pan-STARRS ||  || align=right | 3.4 km || 
|-id=117 bgcolor=#fefefe
| 508117 ||  || — || February 12, 2008 || Mount Lemmon || Mount Lemmon Survey || V || align=right data-sort-value="0.70" | 700 m || 
|-id=118 bgcolor=#E9E9E9
| 508118 ||  || — || October 8, 2012 || Haleakala || Pan-STARRS ||  || align=right | 2.0 km || 
|-id=119 bgcolor=#E9E9E9
| 508119 ||  || — || May 29, 2010 || WISE || WISE ||  || align=right | 3.4 km || 
|-id=120 bgcolor=#E9E9E9
| 508120 ||  || — || March 28, 2011 || Mount Lemmon || Mount Lemmon Survey ||  || align=right | 2.0 km || 
|-id=121 bgcolor=#E9E9E9
| 508121 ||  || — || November 1, 2005 || Mount Lemmon || Mount Lemmon Survey ||  || align=right data-sort-value="0.85" | 850 m || 
|-id=122 bgcolor=#E9E9E9
| 508122 ||  || — || November 14, 2009 || La Sagra || OAM Obs. ||  || align=right | 1.4 km || 
|-id=123 bgcolor=#d6d6d6
| 508123 ||  || — || September 14, 2007 || Siding Spring || SSS ||  || align=right | 3.2 km || 
|-id=124 bgcolor=#E9E9E9
| 508124 ||  || — || April 6, 2011 || Mount Lemmon || Mount Lemmon Survey ||  || align=right data-sort-value="0.86" | 860 m || 
|-id=125 bgcolor=#E9E9E9
| 508125 ||  || — || February 20, 2006 || Kitt Peak || Spacewatch ||  || align=right | 2.4 km || 
|-id=126 bgcolor=#fefefe
| 508126 ||  || — || January 16, 2011 || Mount Lemmon || Mount Lemmon Survey ||  || align=right data-sort-value="0.70" | 700 m || 
|-id=127 bgcolor=#fefefe
| 508127 ||  || — || January 15, 2004 || Kitt Peak || Spacewatch ||  || align=right data-sort-value="0.62" | 620 m || 
|-id=128 bgcolor=#d6d6d6
| 508128 ||  || — || October 15, 2012 || Haleakala || Pan-STARRS ||  || align=right | 2.7 km || 
|-id=129 bgcolor=#fefefe
| 508129 ||  || — || September 25, 2006 || Mount Lemmon || Mount Lemmon Survey ||  || align=right data-sort-value="0.60" | 600 m || 
|-id=130 bgcolor=#fefefe
| 508130 ||  || — || August 19, 2012 || Siding Spring || SSS ||  || align=right | 1.3 km || 
|-id=131 bgcolor=#E9E9E9
| 508131 ||  || — || March 11, 2007 || Kitt Peak || Spacewatch ||  || align=right | 1.00 km || 
|-id=132 bgcolor=#fefefe
| 508132 ||  || — || March 19, 2009 || Kitt Peak || Spacewatch ||  || align=right data-sort-value="0.75" | 750 m || 
|-id=133 bgcolor=#E9E9E9
| 508133 ||  || — || November 29, 2014 || Haleakala || Pan-STARRS ||  || align=right | 1.1 km || 
|-id=134 bgcolor=#E9E9E9
| 508134 ||  || — || March 16, 2015 || Haleakala || Pan-STARRS ||  || align=right | 2.3 km || 
|-id=135 bgcolor=#E9E9E9
| 508135 ||  || — || January 30, 2015 || Haleakala || Pan-STARRS ||  || align=right | 1.6 km || 
|-id=136 bgcolor=#E9E9E9
| 508136 ||  || — || April 18, 2007 || Kitt Peak || Spacewatch ||  || align=right data-sort-value="0.82" | 820 m || 
|-id=137 bgcolor=#fefefe
| 508137 ||  || — || January 28, 2015 || Haleakala || Pan-STARRS ||  || align=right data-sort-value="0.96" | 960 m || 
|-id=138 bgcolor=#d6d6d6
| 508138 ||  || — || October 23, 2011 || Kitt Peak || Spacewatch ||  || align=right | 3.3 km || 
|-id=139 bgcolor=#E9E9E9
| 508139 ||  || — || November 27, 2013 || Haleakala || Pan-STARRS ||  || align=right | 2.8 km || 
|-id=140 bgcolor=#d6d6d6
| 508140 ||  || — || September 23, 2011 || Haleakala || Pan-STARRS ||  || align=right | 2.4 km || 
|-id=141 bgcolor=#fefefe
| 508141 ||  || — || April 26, 2008 || Mount Lemmon || Mount Lemmon Survey ||  || align=right data-sort-value="0.80" | 800 m || 
|-id=142 bgcolor=#E9E9E9
| 508142 ||  || — || February 13, 2010 || Mount Lemmon || Mount Lemmon Survey ||  || align=right | 1.8 km || 
|-id=143 bgcolor=#E9E9E9
| 508143 ||  || — || September 17, 2012 || Kitt Peak || Spacewatch ||  || align=right | 1.9 km || 
|-id=144 bgcolor=#E9E9E9
| 508144 ||  || — || October 26, 2013 || Kitt Peak || Spacewatch ||  || align=right data-sort-value="0.92" | 920 m || 
|-id=145 bgcolor=#E9E9E9
| 508145 ||  || — || October 17, 2012 || Haleakala || Pan-STARRS ||  || align=right | 1.8 km || 
|-id=146 bgcolor=#d6d6d6
| 508146 ||  || — || January 28, 2015 || Haleakala || Pan-STARRS ||  || align=right | 2.6 km || 
|-id=147 bgcolor=#d6d6d6
| 508147 ||  || — || February 14, 2010 || WISE || WISE ||  || align=right | 2.9 km || 
|-id=148 bgcolor=#fefefe
| 508148 ||  || — || April 4, 2008 || Catalina || CSS ||  || align=right data-sort-value="0.89" | 890 m || 
|-id=149 bgcolor=#fefefe
| 508149 ||  || — || January 24, 2007 || Mount Lemmon || Mount Lemmon Survey ||  || align=right data-sort-value="0.62" | 620 m || 
|-id=150 bgcolor=#fefefe
| 508150 ||  || — || March 12, 2007 || Mount Lemmon || Mount Lemmon Survey || MAS || align=right data-sort-value="0.79" | 790 m || 
|-id=151 bgcolor=#E9E9E9
| 508151 ||  || — || September 26, 2008 || Kitt Peak || Spacewatch ||  || align=right | 1.7 km || 
|-id=152 bgcolor=#E9E9E9
| 508152 ||  || — || April 16, 2010 || Mount Lemmon || Mount Lemmon Survey || GEF || align=right | 1.1 km || 
|-id=153 bgcolor=#E9E9E9
| 508153 ||  || — || March 21, 2015 || Haleakala || Pan-STARRS ||  || align=right | 1.2 km || 
|-id=154 bgcolor=#E9E9E9
| 508154 ||  || — || October 20, 2008 || Kitt Peak || Spacewatch ||  || align=right | 1.8 km || 
|-id=155 bgcolor=#E9E9E9
| 508155 ||  || — || January 8, 2006 || Kitt Peak || Spacewatch ||  || align=right | 1.0 km || 
|-id=156 bgcolor=#E9E9E9
| 508156 ||  || — || December 11, 2004 || Kitt Peak || Spacewatch || WIT || align=right data-sort-value="0.83" | 830 m || 
|-id=157 bgcolor=#E9E9E9
| 508157 ||  || — || January 23, 2015 || Haleakala || Pan-STARRS ||  || align=right | 1.1 km || 
|-id=158 bgcolor=#E9E9E9
| 508158 ||  || — || January 31, 2006 || Kitt Peak || Spacewatch ||  || align=right | 1.1 km || 
|-id=159 bgcolor=#d6d6d6
| 508159 ||  || — || March 21, 2015 || Haleakala || Pan-STARRS ||  || align=right | 2.1 km || 
|-id=160 bgcolor=#E9E9E9
| 508160 ||  || — || March 1, 2011 || Mount Lemmon || Mount Lemmon Survey ||  || align=right data-sort-value="0.93" | 930 m || 
|-id=161 bgcolor=#E9E9E9
| 508161 ||  || — || March 2, 2011 || Mount Lemmon || Mount Lemmon Survey ||  || align=right | 1.2 km || 
|-id=162 bgcolor=#E9E9E9
| 508162 ||  || — || December 28, 2013 || Kitt Peak || Spacewatch ||  || align=right | 1.9 km || 
|-id=163 bgcolor=#E9E9E9
| 508163 ||  || — || September 27, 2008 || Mount Lemmon || Mount Lemmon Survey ||  || align=right | 2.2 km || 
|-id=164 bgcolor=#fefefe
| 508164 ||  || — || December 13, 2010 || Kitt Peak || Spacewatch ||  || align=right data-sort-value="0.74" | 740 m || 
|-id=165 bgcolor=#E9E9E9
| 508165 ||  || — || January 30, 2006 || Kitt Peak || Spacewatch ||  || align=right | 2.4 km || 
|-id=166 bgcolor=#fefefe
| 508166 ||  || — || September 23, 2009 || Kitt Peak || Spacewatch ||  || align=right data-sort-value="0.76" | 760 m || 
|-id=167 bgcolor=#E9E9E9
| 508167 ||  || — || January 12, 2010 || Catalina || CSS ||  || align=right | 2.2 km || 
|-id=168 bgcolor=#d6d6d6
| 508168 ||  || — || January 25, 2015 || Haleakala || Pan-STARRS ||  || align=right | 2.8 km || 
|-id=169 bgcolor=#d6d6d6
| 508169 ||  || — || October 20, 2012 || Mount Lemmon || Mount Lemmon Survey ||  || align=right | 3.7 km || 
|-id=170 bgcolor=#d6d6d6
| 508170 ||  || — || March 22, 2015 || Haleakala || Pan-STARRS ||  || align=right | 2.4 km || 
|-id=171 bgcolor=#fefefe
| 508171 ||  || — || November 18, 2006 || Kitt Peak || Spacewatch || NYS || align=right data-sort-value="0.47" | 470 m || 
|-id=172 bgcolor=#E9E9E9
| 508172 ||  || — || March 25, 2006 || Kitt Peak || Spacewatch ||  || align=right | 2.4 km || 
|-id=173 bgcolor=#E9E9E9
| 508173 ||  || — || March 26, 2007 || Mount Lemmon || Mount Lemmon Survey ||  || align=right | 1.3 km || 
|-id=174 bgcolor=#E9E9E9
| 508174 ||  || — || March 29, 2011 || Kitt Peak || Spacewatch ||  || align=right | 1.6 km || 
|-id=175 bgcolor=#E9E9E9
| 508175 ||  || — || March 11, 2007 || Kitt Peak || Spacewatch ||  || align=right data-sort-value="0.75" | 750 m || 
|-id=176 bgcolor=#fefefe
| 508176 ||  || — || November 7, 2007 || Kitt Peak || Spacewatch ||  || align=right data-sort-value="0.63" | 630 m || 
|-id=177 bgcolor=#E9E9E9
| 508177 ||  || — || November 9, 2008 || Mount Lemmon || Mount Lemmon Survey ||  || align=right | 1.9 km || 
|-id=178 bgcolor=#E9E9E9
| 508178 ||  || — || April 24, 2011 || Siding Spring || SSS ||  || align=right | 1.7 km || 
|-id=179 bgcolor=#fefefe
| 508179 ||  || — || December 13, 2006 || Kitt Peak || Spacewatch || NYS || align=right data-sort-value="0.58" | 580 m || 
|-id=180 bgcolor=#d6d6d6
| 508180 ||  || — || January 28, 2015 || Haleakala || Pan-STARRS ||  || align=right | 2.8 km || 
|-id=181 bgcolor=#d6d6d6
| 508181 ||  || — || March 28, 2015 || Haleakala || Pan-STARRS ||  || align=right | 3.1 km || 
|-id=182 bgcolor=#d6d6d6
| 508182 ||  || — || December 12, 2012 || Mount Lemmon || Mount Lemmon Survey ||  || align=right | 2.6 km || 
|-id=183 bgcolor=#E9E9E9
| 508183 ||  || — || March 4, 2005 || Kitt Peak || Spacewatch ||  || align=right | 2.3 km || 
|-id=184 bgcolor=#E9E9E9
| 508184 ||  || — || January 8, 2015 || Haleakala || Pan-STARRS ||  || align=right | 1.7 km || 
|-id=185 bgcolor=#E9E9E9
| 508185 ||  || — || October 15, 2012 || Haleakala || Pan-STARRS || NEM || align=right | 1.7 km || 
|-id=186 bgcolor=#E9E9E9
| 508186 ||  || — || January 23, 2015 || Haleakala || Pan-STARRS ||  || align=right | 2.3 km || 
|-id=187 bgcolor=#d6d6d6
| 508187 ||  || — || October 12, 2007 || Mount Lemmon || Mount Lemmon Survey ||  || align=right | 2.2 km || 
|-id=188 bgcolor=#E9E9E9
| 508188 ||  || — || November 9, 2013 || Haleakala || Pan-STARRS || EUN || align=right | 1.2 km || 
|-id=189 bgcolor=#d6d6d6
| 508189 ||  || — || July 27, 2005 || Siding Spring || SSS ||  || align=right | 4.2 km || 
|-id=190 bgcolor=#E9E9E9
| 508190 ||  || — || April 30, 2011 || Kitt Peak || Spacewatch ||  || align=right | 1.5 km || 
|-id=191 bgcolor=#E9E9E9
| 508191 ||  || — || December 10, 2009 || Mount Lemmon || Mount Lemmon Survey ||  || align=right data-sort-value="0.79" | 790 m || 
|-id=192 bgcolor=#E9E9E9
| 508192 ||  || — || September 3, 2008 || Kitt Peak || Spacewatch ||  || align=right | 1.3 km || 
|-id=193 bgcolor=#E9E9E9
| 508193 ||  || — || January 23, 2015 || Haleakala || Pan-STARRS || EUN || align=right | 1.2 km || 
|-id=194 bgcolor=#E9E9E9
| 508194 ||  || — || December 3, 2004 || Kitt Peak || Spacewatch ||  || align=right | 2.4 km || 
|-id=195 bgcolor=#E9E9E9
| 508195 ||  || — || September 28, 2003 || Kitt Peak || Spacewatch ||  || align=right | 2.2 km || 
|-id=196 bgcolor=#E9E9E9
| 508196 ||  || — || April 30, 2006 || Kitt Peak || Spacewatch ||  || align=right | 2.1 km || 
|-id=197 bgcolor=#E9E9E9
| 508197 ||  || — || October 10, 2008 || Mount Lemmon || Mount Lemmon Survey ||  || align=right | 2.1 km || 
|-id=198 bgcolor=#E9E9E9
| 508198 ||  || — || June 14, 2007 || Kitt Peak || Spacewatch ||  || align=right | 3.4 km || 
|-id=199 bgcolor=#E9E9E9
| 508199 ||  || — || April 20, 2007 || Kitt Peak || Spacewatch ||  || align=right | 1.6 km || 
|-id=200 bgcolor=#d6d6d6
| 508200 ||  || — || September 25, 2006 || Mount Lemmon || Mount Lemmon Survey ||  || align=right | 2.3 km || 
|}

508201–508300 

|-bgcolor=#E9E9E9
| 508201 ||  || — || March 3, 2006 || Kitt Peak || Spacewatch ||  || align=right | 1.6 km || 
|-id=202 bgcolor=#d6d6d6
| 508202 ||  || — || February 28, 2014 || Haleakala || Pan-STARRS ||  || align=right | 2.3 km || 
|-id=203 bgcolor=#d6d6d6
| 508203 ||  || — || October 15, 2012 || Haleakala || Pan-STARRS ||  || align=right | 1.8 km || 
|-id=204 bgcolor=#E9E9E9
| 508204 ||  || — || November 1, 2000 || Socorro || LINEAR ||  || align=right | 1.9 km || 
|-id=205 bgcolor=#E9E9E9
| 508205 ||  || — || March 25, 2006 || Catalina || CSS ||  || align=right | 1.8 km || 
|-id=206 bgcolor=#E9E9E9
| 508206 ||  || — || January 26, 2006 || Mount Lemmon || Mount Lemmon Survey ||  || align=right | 1.6 km || 
|-id=207 bgcolor=#E9E9E9
| 508207 ||  || — || December 7, 2008 || Mount Lemmon || Mount Lemmon Survey ||  || align=right | 2.2 km || 
|-id=208 bgcolor=#E9E9E9
| 508208 ||  || — || December 18, 2004 || Mount Lemmon || Mount Lemmon Survey ||  || align=right | 1.9 km || 
|-id=209 bgcolor=#E9E9E9
| 508209 ||  || — || March 3, 2006 || Kitt Peak || Spacewatch ||  || align=right | 1.1 km || 
|-id=210 bgcolor=#d6d6d6
| 508210 ||  || — || April 12, 2010 || WISE || WISE ||  || align=right | 3.5 km || 
|-id=211 bgcolor=#fefefe
| 508211 ||  || — || December 1, 2006 || Mount Lemmon || Mount Lemmon Survey ||  || align=right data-sort-value="0.75" | 750 m || 
|-id=212 bgcolor=#d6d6d6
| 508212 ||  || — || October 8, 2012 || Mount Lemmon || Mount Lemmon Survey ||  || align=right | 2.3 km || 
|-id=213 bgcolor=#E9E9E9
| 508213 ||  || — || March 18, 2010 || WISE || WISE ||  || align=right | 1.9 km || 
|-id=214 bgcolor=#E9E9E9
| 508214 ||  || — || December 3, 2008 || Mount Lemmon || Mount Lemmon Survey ||  || align=right | 1.9 km || 
|-id=215 bgcolor=#d6d6d6
| 508215 ||  || — || January 1, 2008 || Kitt Peak || Spacewatch ||  || align=right | 3.0 km || 
|-id=216 bgcolor=#E9E9E9
| 508216 ||  || — || February 16, 2015 || Haleakala || Pan-STARRS ||  || align=right | 2.5 km || 
|-id=217 bgcolor=#fefefe
| 508217 ||  || — || March 30, 2000 || Kitt Peak || Spacewatch ||  || align=right data-sort-value="0.69" | 690 m || 
|-id=218 bgcolor=#fefefe
| 508218 ||  || — || January 8, 2007 || Mount Lemmon || Mount Lemmon Survey ||  || align=right data-sort-value="0.64" | 640 m || 
|-id=219 bgcolor=#E9E9E9
| 508219 ||  || — || March 13, 2011 || Mount Lemmon || Mount Lemmon Survey ||  || align=right data-sort-value="0.71" | 710 m || 
|-id=220 bgcolor=#d6d6d6
| 508220 ||  || — || May 3, 2010 || Kitt Peak || Spacewatch ||  || align=right | 3.2 km || 
|-id=221 bgcolor=#fefefe
| 508221 ||  || — || November 9, 2007 || Mount Lemmon || Mount Lemmon Survey ||  || align=right data-sort-value="0.62" | 620 m || 
|-id=222 bgcolor=#E9E9E9
| 508222 ||  || — || April 15, 2007 || Kitt Peak || Spacewatch ||  || align=right data-sort-value="0.84" | 840 m || 
|-id=223 bgcolor=#d6d6d6
| 508223 ||  || — || December 10, 2012 || Haleakala || Pan-STARRS ||  || align=right | 2.6 km || 
|-id=224 bgcolor=#E9E9E9
| 508224 ||  || — || April 23, 2011 || Haleakala || Pan-STARRS ||  || align=right data-sort-value="0.72" | 720 m || 
|-id=225 bgcolor=#E9E9E9
| 508225 ||  || — || December 30, 2013 || Haleakala || Pan-STARRS ||  || align=right | 2.0 km || 
|-id=226 bgcolor=#E9E9E9
| 508226 ||  || — || December 4, 2013 || Haleakala || Pan-STARRS ||  || align=right | 2.3 km || 
|-id=227 bgcolor=#d6d6d6
| 508227 ||  || — || September 15, 2007 || Anderson Mesa || LONEOS ||  || align=right | 4.9 km || 
|-id=228 bgcolor=#d6d6d6
| 508228 ||  || — || January 1, 2008 || Kitt Peak || Spacewatch ||  || align=right | 3.1 km || 
|-id=229 bgcolor=#d6d6d6
| 508229 ||  || — || February 15, 2010 || WISE || WISE ||  || align=right | 3.7 km || 
|-id=230 bgcolor=#fefefe
| 508230 ||  || — || December 19, 2003 || Socorro || LINEAR ||  || align=right data-sort-value="0.92" | 920 m || 
|-id=231 bgcolor=#E9E9E9
| 508231 ||  || — || March 20, 2015 || Haleakala || Pan-STARRS ||  || align=right | 2.0 km || 
|-id=232 bgcolor=#d6d6d6
| 508232 ||  || — || October 10, 2012 || Mount Lemmon || Mount Lemmon Survey ||  || align=right | 3.1 km || 
|-id=233 bgcolor=#E9E9E9
| 508233 ||  || — || January 28, 2015 || Haleakala || Pan-STARRS ||  || align=right | 2.1 km || 
|-id=234 bgcolor=#d6d6d6
| 508234 ||  || — || October 4, 2002 || Campo Imperatore || CINEOS || 3:2 || align=right | 5.4 km || 
|-id=235 bgcolor=#d6d6d6
| 508235 ||  || — || June 15, 2010 || Mount Lemmon || Mount Lemmon Survey ||  || align=right | 3.9 km || 
|-id=236 bgcolor=#E9E9E9
| 508236 ||  || — || January 23, 2006 || Kitt Peak || Spacewatch ||  || align=right | 1.4 km || 
|-id=237 bgcolor=#E9E9E9
| 508237 ||  || — || March 23, 2006 || Kitt Peak || Spacewatch ||  || align=right | 2.0 km || 
|-id=238 bgcolor=#E9E9E9
| 508238 ||  || — || September 16, 2003 || Kitt Peak || Spacewatch ||  || align=right | 1.6 km || 
|-id=239 bgcolor=#E9E9E9
| 508239 ||  || — || October 1, 2008 || Mount Lemmon || Mount Lemmon Survey ||  || align=right | 1.5 km || 
|-id=240 bgcolor=#E9E9E9
| 508240 ||  || — || May 25, 2006 || Kitt Peak || Spacewatch ||  || align=right | 2.2 km || 
|-id=241 bgcolor=#E9E9E9
| 508241 ||  || — || January 28, 2015 || Haleakala || Pan-STARRS ||  || align=right | 2.0 km || 
|-id=242 bgcolor=#d6d6d6
| 508242 ||  || — || June 14, 2010 || Mount Lemmon || Mount Lemmon Survey ||  || align=right | 2.5 km || 
|-id=243 bgcolor=#d6d6d6
| 508243 ||  || — || September 23, 2012 || Kitt Peak || Spacewatch ||  || align=right | 2.2 km || 
|-id=244 bgcolor=#E9E9E9
| 508244 ||  || — || September 22, 2008 || Kitt Peak || Spacewatch ||  || align=right | 1.7 km || 
|-id=245 bgcolor=#d6d6d6
| 508245 ||  || — || October 25, 2011 || Haleakala || Pan-STARRS ||  || align=right | 3.6 km || 
|-id=246 bgcolor=#d6d6d6
| 508246 ||  || — || September 25, 2011 || Haleakala || Pan-STARRS ||  || align=right | 2.5 km || 
|-id=247 bgcolor=#d6d6d6
| 508247 ||  || — || January 7, 2013 || Haleakala || Pan-STARRS ||  || align=right | 3.3 km || 
|-id=248 bgcolor=#d6d6d6
| 508248 ||  || — || October 4, 1994 || Kitt Peak || Spacewatch ||  || align=right | 2.8 km || 
|-id=249 bgcolor=#d6d6d6
| 508249 ||  || — || October 24, 2011 || Mount Lemmon || Mount Lemmon Survey ||  || align=right | 1.9 km || 
|-id=250 bgcolor=#d6d6d6
| 508250 ||  || — || January 20, 2009 || Kitt Peak || Spacewatch ||  || align=right | 2.0 km || 
|-id=251 bgcolor=#E9E9E9
| 508251 ||  || — || November 17, 2008 || Kitt Peak || Spacewatch ||  || align=right | 1.9 km || 
|-id=252 bgcolor=#d6d6d6
| 508252 ||  || — || March 17, 2015 || Haleakala || Pan-STARRS ||  || align=right | 1.7 km || 
|-id=253 bgcolor=#d6d6d6
| 508253 ||  || — || August 27, 2006 || Kitt Peak || Spacewatch ||  || align=right | 2.2 km || 
|-id=254 bgcolor=#E9E9E9
| 508254 ||  || — || April 26, 2006 || Kitt Peak || Spacewatch ||  || align=right | 1.8 km || 
|-id=255 bgcolor=#d6d6d6
| 508255 ||  || — || March 18, 2009 || Kitt Peak || Spacewatch ||  || align=right | 2.5 km || 
|-id=256 bgcolor=#E9E9E9
| 508256 ||  || — || January 31, 2006 || Mount Lemmon || Mount Lemmon Survey ||  || align=right | 1.4 km || 
|-id=257 bgcolor=#d6d6d6
| 508257 ||  || — || September 17, 2006 || Kitt Peak || Spacewatch ||  || align=right | 2.3 km || 
|-id=258 bgcolor=#d6d6d6
| 508258 ||  || — || October 21, 2012 || Haleakala || Pan-STARRS ||  || align=right | 2.7 km || 
|-id=259 bgcolor=#d6d6d6
| 508259 ||  || — || December 6, 2012 || Mount Lemmon || Mount Lemmon Survey ||  || align=right | 2.7 km || 
|-id=260 bgcolor=#E9E9E9
| 508260 ||  || — || January 1, 2014 || Haleakala || Pan-STARRS || AGN || align=right | 1.2 km || 
|-id=261 bgcolor=#d6d6d6
| 508261 ||  || — || February 3, 2009 || Mount Lemmon || Mount Lemmon Survey ||  || align=right | 3.1 km || 
|-id=262 bgcolor=#d6d6d6
| 508262 ||  || — || March 2, 2009 || Mount Lemmon || Mount Lemmon Survey ||  || align=right | 2.1 km || 
|-id=263 bgcolor=#E9E9E9
| 508263 ||  || — || April 15, 2010 || WISE || WISE || ADE || align=right | 1.6 km || 
|-id=264 bgcolor=#d6d6d6
| 508264 ||  || — || October 23, 2012 || Kitt Peak || Spacewatch ||  || align=right | 2.1 km || 
|-id=265 bgcolor=#E9E9E9
| 508265 ||  || — || November 27, 2013 || Haleakala || Pan-STARRS ||  || align=right | 1.5 km || 
|-id=266 bgcolor=#d6d6d6
| 508266 ||  || — || April 10, 2005 || Kitt Peak || Spacewatch || KOR || align=right | 1.4 km || 
|-id=267 bgcolor=#d6d6d6
| 508267 ||  || — || October 22, 2011 || Mount Lemmon || Mount Lemmon Survey ||  || align=right | 2.6 km || 
|-id=268 bgcolor=#d6d6d6
| 508268 ||  || — || January 20, 2009 || Kitt Peak || Spacewatch ||  || align=right | 2.2 km || 
|-id=269 bgcolor=#E9E9E9
| 508269 ||  || — || April 7, 2011 || Kitt Peak || Spacewatch ||  || align=right | 1.2 km || 
|-id=270 bgcolor=#E9E9E9
| 508270 ||  || — || January 28, 2015 || Haleakala || Pan-STARRS || MAR || align=right | 1.2 km || 
|-id=271 bgcolor=#E9E9E9
| 508271 ||  || — || February 1, 2006 || Kitt Peak || Spacewatch ||  || align=right | 1.5 km || 
|-id=272 bgcolor=#fefefe
| 508272 ||  || — || March 9, 2011 || Mount Lemmon || Mount Lemmon Survey || NYS || align=right data-sort-value="0.73" | 730 m || 
|-id=273 bgcolor=#fefefe
| 508273 ||  || — || February 29, 2004 || Kitt Peak || Spacewatch ||  || align=right | 1.3 km || 
|-id=274 bgcolor=#E9E9E9
| 508274 ||  || — || May 24, 2011 || Haleakala || Pan-STARRS ||  || align=right data-sort-value="0.95" | 950 m || 
|-id=275 bgcolor=#E9E9E9
| 508275 ||  || — || September 13, 2007 || Kitt Peak || Spacewatch ||  || align=right | 2.3 km || 
|-id=276 bgcolor=#E9E9E9
| 508276 ||  || — || March 14, 2011 || Mount Lemmon || Mount Lemmon Survey ||  || align=right | 1.2 km || 
|-id=277 bgcolor=#d6d6d6
| 508277 ||  || — || September 30, 2006 || Mount Lemmon || Mount Lemmon Survey ||  || align=right | 2.6 km || 
|-id=278 bgcolor=#d6d6d6
| 508278 ||  || — || January 11, 2008 || Kitt Peak || Spacewatch ||  || align=right | 2.5 km || 
|-id=279 bgcolor=#d6d6d6
| 508279 ||  || — || April 23, 2015 || Haleakala || Pan-STARRS ||  || align=right | 2.8 km || 
|-id=280 bgcolor=#d6d6d6
| 508280 ||  || — || February 20, 2009 || Kitt Peak || Spacewatch ||  || align=right | 2.9 km || 
|-id=281 bgcolor=#d6d6d6
| 508281 ||  || — || September 26, 1995 || Kitt Peak || Spacewatch ||  || align=right | 2.3 km || 
|-id=282 bgcolor=#d6d6d6
| 508282 ||  || — || September 17, 2006 || Catalina || CSS ||  || align=right | 3.2 km || 
|-id=283 bgcolor=#d6d6d6
| 508283 ||  || — || February 20, 2009 || Kitt Peak || Spacewatch ||  || align=right | 2.5 km || 
|-id=284 bgcolor=#E9E9E9
| 508284 ||  || — || October 26, 1995 || Kitt Peak || Spacewatch ||  || align=right | 2.0 km || 
|-id=285 bgcolor=#d6d6d6
| 508285 ||  || — || April 20, 2009 || Kitt Peak || Spacewatch ||  || align=right | 2.5 km || 
|-id=286 bgcolor=#E9E9E9
| 508286 ||  || — || August 8, 2012 || Haleakala || Pan-STARRS ||  || align=right | 2.0 km || 
|-id=287 bgcolor=#E9E9E9
| 508287 ||  || — || January 21, 2010 || La Sagra || OAM Obs. ||  || align=right | 2.4 km || 
|-id=288 bgcolor=#d6d6d6
| 508288 ||  || — || April 10, 2010 || WISE || WISE ||  || align=right | 3.1 km || 
|-id=289 bgcolor=#d6d6d6
| 508289 ||  || — || January 12, 2008 || Kitt Peak || Spacewatch ||  || align=right | 2.6 km || 
|-id=290 bgcolor=#d6d6d6
| 508290 ||  || — || September 24, 2011 || Haleakala || Pan-STARRS ||  || align=right | 2.6 km || 
|-id=291 bgcolor=#d6d6d6
| 508291 ||  || — || July 4, 2005 || Kitt Peak || Spacewatch ||  || align=right | 2.5 km || 
|-id=292 bgcolor=#d6d6d6
| 508292 ||  || — || May 18, 2015 || Haleakala || Pan-STARRS ||  || align=right | 3.4 km || 
|-id=293 bgcolor=#E9E9E9
| 508293 ||  || — || December 2, 2005 || Mount Lemmon || Mount Lemmon Survey ||  || align=right data-sort-value="0.80" | 800 m || 
|-id=294 bgcolor=#E9E9E9
| 508294 ||  || — || May 29, 2006 || Kitt Peak || Spacewatch ||  || align=right | 1.4 km || 
|-id=295 bgcolor=#E9E9E9
| 508295 ||  || — || November 12, 2012 || Mount Lemmon || Mount Lemmon Survey ||  || align=right | 1.7 km || 
|-id=296 bgcolor=#E9E9E9
| 508296 ||  || — || September 10, 2007 || Kitt Peak || Spacewatch ||  || align=right | 1.9 km || 
|-id=297 bgcolor=#d6d6d6
| 508297 ||  || — || December 28, 2013 || Kitt Peak || Spacewatch ||  || align=right | 2.2 km || 
|-id=298 bgcolor=#E9E9E9
| 508298 ||  || — || September 19, 2007 || Kitt Peak || Spacewatch ||  || align=right | 2.3 km || 
|-id=299 bgcolor=#d6d6d6
| 508299 ||  || — || October 22, 2006 || Kitt Peak || Spacewatch ||  || align=right | 2.9 km || 
|-id=300 bgcolor=#d6d6d6
| 508300 ||  || — || April 2, 2010 || WISE || WISE ||  || align=right | 5.7 km || 
|}

508301–508400 

|-bgcolor=#d6d6d6
| 508301 ||  || — || March 2, 2009 || Mount Lemmon || Mount Lemmon Survey ||  || align=right | 2.5 km || 
|-id=302 bgcolor=#d6d6d6
| 508302 ||  || — || April 30, 2003 || Kitt Peak || Spacewatch ||  || align=right | 2.8 km || 
|-id=303 bgcolor=#d6d6d6
| 508303 ||  || — || April 18, 2009 || Mount Lemmon || Mount Lemmon Survey ||  || align=right | 2.4 km || 
|-id=304 bgcolor=#d6d6d6
| 508304 ||  || — || May 11, 2010 || WISE || WISE ||  || align=right | 4.0 km || 
|-id=305 bgcolor=#E9E9E9
| 508305 ||  || — || March 28, 2015 || Haleakala || Pan-STARRS ||  || align=right | 1.4 km || 
|-id=306 bgcolor=#d6d6d6
| 508306 ||  || — || October 15, 2006 || Kitt Peak || Spacewatch ||  || align=right | 3.0 km || 
|-id=307 bgcolor=#d6d6d6
| 508307 ||  || — || December 6, 2012 || Mount Lemmon || Mount Lemmon Survey ||  || align=right | 2.6 km || 
|-id=308 bgcolor=#d6d6d6
| 508308 ||  || — || September 24, 2011 || Haleakala || Pan-STARRS ||  || align=right | 2.9 km || 
|-id=309 bgcolor=#d6d6d6
| 508309 ||  || — || March 19, 2009 || Mount Lemmon || Mount Lemmon Survey ||  || align=right | 2.1 km || 
|-id=310 bgcolor=#d6d6d6
| 508310 ||  || — || April 13, 2010 || WISE || WISE ||  || align=right | 3.5 km || 
|-id=311 bgcolor=#E9E9E9
| 508311 ||  || — || February 14, 2010 || Haleakala || Pan-STARRS ||  || align=right | 1.4 km || 
|-id=312 bgcolor=#d6d6d6
| 508312 ||  || — || May 13, 2015 || Mount Lemmon || Mount Lemmon Survey ||  || align=right | 2.6 km || 
|-id=313 bgcolor=#fefefe
| 508313 ||  || — || April 14, 2004 || Anderson Mesa || LONEOS || V || align=right data-sort-value="0.92" | 920 m || 
|-id=314 bgcolor=#E9E9E9
| 508314 ||  || — || March 16, 2010 || Mount Lemmon || Mount Lemmon Survey ||  || align=right | 1.6 km || 
|-id=315 bgcolor=#E9E9E9
| 508315 ||  || — || October 29, 2008 || Kitt Peak || Spacewatch ||  || align=right | 2.3 km || 
|-id=316 bgcolor=#d6d6d6
| 508316 ||  || — || October 16, 2006 || Kitt Peak || Spacewatch ||  || align=right | 2.9 km || 
|-id=317 bgcolor=#E9E9E9
| 508317 ||  || — || January 10, 2014 || Kitt Peak || Spacewatch ||  || align=right | 1.7 km || 
|-id=318 bgcolor=#E9E9E9
| 508318 ||  || — || January 25, 2006 || Kitt Peak || Spacewatch ||  || align=right | 1.2 km || 
|-id=319 bgcolor=#E9E9E9
| 508319 ||  || — || March 13, 2010 || Kitt Peak || Spacewatch ||  || align=right | 1.9 km || 
|-id=320 bgcolor=#E9E9E9
| 508320 ||  || — || January 26, 2006 || Mount Lemmon || Mount Lemmon Survey ||  || align=right | 1.6 km || 
|-id=321 bgcolor=#d6d6d6
| 508321 ||  || — || September 24, 2011 || Haleakala || Pan-STARRS ||  || align=right | 3.0 km || 
|-id=322 bgcolor=#d6d6d6
| 508322 ||  || — || September 24, 2011 || Haleakala || Pan-STARRS ||  || align=right | 2.6 km || 
|-id=323 bgcolor=#d6d6d6
| 508323 ||  || — || April 14, 2010 || WISE || WISE ||  || align=right | 4.3 km || 
|-id=324 bgcolor=#d6d6d6
| 508324 ||  || — || September 26, 2011 || Haleakala || Pan-STARRS ||  || align=right | 2.4 km || 
|-id=325 bgcolor=#d6d6d6
| 508325 ||  || — || April 20, 2009 || Mount Lemmon || Mount Lemmon Survey ||  || align=right | 2.3 km || 
|-id=326 bgcolor=#d6d6d6
| 508326 ||  || — || May 27, 2009 || Mount Lemmon || Mount Lemmon Survey ||  || align=right | 4.1 km || 
|-id=327 bgcolor=#E9E9E9
| 508327 ||  || — || December 21, 2008 || Mount Lemmon || Mount Lemmon Survey ||  || align=right | 1.6 km || 
|-id=328 bgcolor=#d6d6d6
| 508328 ||  || — || March 4, 2014 || Haleakala || Pan-STARRS ||  || align=right | 2.4 km || 
|-id=329 bgcolor=#d6d6d6
| 508329 ||  || — || May 20, 2014 || Haleakala || Pan-STARRS ||  || align=right | 3.1 km || 
|-id=330 bgcolor=#d6d6d6
| 508330 ||  || — || November 1, 2007 || Kitt Peak || Spacewatch ||  || align=right | 2.6 km || 
|-id=331 bgcolor=#d6d6d6
| 508331 ||  || — || May 21, 2015 || Haleakala || Pan-STARRS ||  || align=right | 2.3 km || 
|-id=332 bgcolor=#E9E9E9
| 508332 ||  || — || April 2, 2006 || Anderson Mesa || LONEOS ||  || align=right | 2.1 km || 
|-id=333 bgcolor=#d6d6d6
| 508333 ||  || — || March 28, 2009 || Mount Lemmon || Mount Lemmon Survey ||  || align=right | 2.9 km || 
|-id=334 bgcolor=#d6d6d6
| 508334 ||  || — || June 12, 2009 || Kitt Peak || Spacewatch ||  || align=right | 3.0 km || 
|-id=335 bgcolor=#d6d6d6
| 508335 ||  || — || April 27, 2010 || WISE || WISE ||  || align=right | 3.3 km || 
|-id=336 bgcolor=#d6d6d6
| 508336 ||  || — || September 18, 2010 || Kitt Peak || Spacewatch ||  || align=right | 2.8 km || 
|-id=337 bgcolor=#d6d6d6
| 508337 ||  || — || February 18, 2013 || Kitt Peak || Spacewatch || 3:2 || align=right | 3.7 km || 
|-id=338 bgcolor=#C2E0FF
| 508338 ||  || — || October 8, 2010 || La Silla || M. E. Schwamb || SDO || align=right | 205 km || 
|-id=339 bgcolor=#d6d6d6
| 508339 ||  || — || September 18, 2004 || Siding Spring || SSS ||  || align=right | 3.3 km || 
|-id=340 bgcolor=#E9E9E9
| 508340 ||  || — || September 27, 2011 || Mount Lemmon || Mount Lemmon Survey ||  || align=right data-sort-value="0.95" | 950 m || 
|-id=341 bgcolor=#FA8072
| 508341 ||  || — || June 3, 1995 || Kitt Peak || Spacewatch ||  || align=right data-sort-value="0.54" | 540 m || 
|-id=342 bgcolor=#E9E9E9
| 508342 ||  || — || November 17, 2006 || Kitt Peak || Spacewatch ||  || align=right | 1.1 km || 
|-id=343 bgcolor=#fefefe
| 508343 ||  || — || May 31, 2011 || Mount Lemmon || Mount Lemmon Survey || H || align=right data-sort-value="0.59" | 590 m || 
|-id=344 bgcolor=#fefefe
| 508344 ||  || — || December 7, 2005 || Catalina || CSS || H || align=right data-sort-value="0.57" | 570 m || 
|-id=345 bgcolor=#fefefe
| 508345 ||  || — || May 21, 2006 || Kitt Peak || Spacewatch || H || align=right data-sort-value="0.62" | 620 m || 
|-id=346 bgcolor=#fefefe
| 508346 ||  || — || November 25, 2012 || Haleakala || Pan-STARRS || H || align=right data-sort-value="0.71" | 710 m || 
|-id=347 bgcolor=#FA8072
| 508347 ||  || — || January 15, 2008 || Mount Lemmon || Mount Lemmon Survey || H || align=right data-sort-value="0.62" | 620 m || 
|-id=348 bgcolor=#fefefe
| 508348 ||  || — || December 22, 2008 || Mount Lemmon || Mount Lemmon Survey ||  || align=right | 1.1 km || 
|-id=349 bgcolor=#fefefe
| 508349 ||  || — || October 7, 2012 || Haleakala || Pan-STARRS || H || align=right data-sort-value="0.49" | 490 m || 
|-id=350 bgcolor=#fefefe
| 508350 ||  || — || March 26, 2011 || Mount Lemmon || Mount Lemmon Survey || H || align=right data-sort-value="0.52" | 520 m || 
|-id=351 bgcolor=#fefefe
| 508351 ||  || — || December 19, 2007 || Mount Lemmon || Mount Lemmon Survey ||  || align=right data-sort-value="0.89" | 890 m || 
|-id=352 bgcolor=#E9E9E9
| 508352 ||  || — || January 14, 2011 || Kitt Peak || Spacewatch ||  || align=right | 1.5 km || 
|-id=353 bgcolor=#fefefe
| 508353 ||  || — || December 6, 2010 || Mount Lemmon || Mount Lemmon Survey ||  || align=right | 1.1 km || 
|-id=354 bgcolor=#fefefe
| 508354 ||  || — || December 9, 2015 || Haleakala || Pan-STARRS || H || align=right data-sort-value="0.67" | 670 m || 
|-id=355 bgcolor=#fefefe
| 508355 ||  || — || November 13, 2010 || Mount Lemmon || Mount Lemmon Survey ||  || align=right | 1.2 km || 
|-id=356 bgcolor=#fefefe
| 508356 ||  || — || April 3, 2008 || Mount Lemmon || Mount Lemmon Survey || H || align=right data-sort-value="0.56" | 560 m || 
|-id=357 bgcolor=#fefefe
| 508357 ||  || — || December 18, 2007 || Catalina || CSS || H || align=right data-sort-value="0.83" | 830 m || 
|-id=358 bgcolor=#fefefe
| 508358 ||  || — || August 20, 2014 || Haleakala || Pan-STARRS || H || align=right data-sort-value="0.70" | 700 m || 
|-id=359 bgcolor=#fefefe
| 508359 ||  || — || August 18, 2006 || Kitt Peak || Spacewatch ||  || align=right data-sort-value="0.74" | 740 m || 
|-id=360 bgcolor=#E9E9E9
| 508360 ||  || — || January 30, 2011 || Haleakala || Pan-STARRS ||  || align=right | 2.1 km || 
|-id=361 bgcolor=#E9E9E9
| 508361 ||  || — || August 2, 2008 || Siding Spring || SSS ||  || align=right | 1.9 km || 
|-id=362 bgcolor=#fefefe
| 508362 ||  || — || March 4, 2005 || Mount Lemmon || Mount Lemmon Survey ||  || align=right data-sort-value="0.83" | 830 m || 
|-id=363 bgcolor=#E9E9E9
| 508363 ||  || — || January 18, 2016 || Haleakala || Pan-STARRS ||  || align=right | 2.8 km || 
|-id=364 bgcolor=#fefefe
| 508364 ||  || — || May 5, 2013 || Haleakala || Pan-STARRS ||  || align=right data-sort-value="0.61" | 610 m || 
|-id=365 bgcolor=#fefefe
| 508365 ||  || — || February 26, 2009 || Kitt Peak || Spacewatch ||  || align=right data-sort-value="0.61" | 610 m || 
|-id=366 bgcolor=#E9E9E9
| 508366 ||  || — || March 15, 2016 || Haleakala || Pan-STARRS ||  || align=right | 1.7 km || 
|-id=367 bgcolor=#E9E9E9
| 508367 ||  || — || November 6, 2013 || Haleakala || Pan-STARRS ||  || align=right | 1.4 km || 
|-id=368 bgcolor=#fefefe
| 508368 ||  || — || October 17, 2006 || Kitt Peak || Spacewatch || H || align=right data-sort-value="0.55" | 550 m || 
|-id=369 bgcolor=#d6d6d6
| 508369 ||  || — || October 18, 2012 || Haleakala || Pan-STARRS ||  || align=right | 2.7 km || 
|-id=370 bgcolor=#fefefe
| 508370 ||  || — || March 16, 2005 || Catalina || CSS ||  || align=right | 1.0 km || 
|-id=371 bgcolor=#d6d6d6
| 508371 ||  || — || September 12, 2007 || Catalina || CSS ||  || align=right | 3.6 km || 
|-id=372 bgcolor=#fefefe
| 508372 ||  || — || October 31, 2010 || Mount Lemmon || Mount Lemmon Survey ||  || align=right data-sort-value="0.76" | 760 m || 
|-id=373 bgcolor=#E9E9E9
| 508373 ||  || — || October 22, 2008 || Mount Lemmon || Mount Lemmon Survey ||  || align=right | 2.6 km || 
|-id=374 bgcolor=#E9E9E9
| 508374 ||  || — || November 17, 2009 || Kitt Peak || Spacewatch ||  || align=right data-sort-value="0.93" | 930 m || 
|-id=375 bgcolor=#E9E9E9
| 508375 ||  || — || May 5, 2008 || Mount Lemmon || Mount Lemmon Survey ||  || align=right data-sort-value="0.97" | 970 m || 
|-id=376 bgcolor=#fefefe
| 508376 ||  || — || August 29, 2009 || Socorro || LINEAR || H || align=right data-sort-value="0.76" | 760 m || 
|-id=377 bgcolor=#E9E9E9
| 508377 ||  || — || January 8, 2016 || Haleakala || Pan-STARRS ||  || align=right | 1.8 km || 
|-id=378 bgcolor=#fefefe
| 508378 ||  || — || October 11, 2007 || Mount Lemmon || Mount Lemmon Survey ||  || align=right data-sort-value="0.85" | 850 m || 
|-id=379 bgcolor=#fefefe
| 508379 ||  || — || December 28, 2014 || Mount Lemmon || Mount Lemmon Survey ||  || align=right data-sort-value="0.72" | 720 m || 
|-id=380 bgcolor=#fefefe
| 508380 ||  || — || November 5, 2007 || Mount Lemmon || Mount Lemmon Survey ||  || align=right data-sort-value="0.61" | 610 m || 
|-id=381 bgcolor=#fefefe
| 508381 ||  || — || March 6, 2008 || Mount Lemmon || Mount Lemmon Survey ||  || align=right data-sort-value="0.71" | 710 m || 
|-id=382 bgcolor=#fefefe
| 508382 ||  || — || November 17, 2009 || Kitt Peak || Spacewatch || H || align=right data-sort-value="0.60" | 600 m || 
|-id=383 bgcolor=#d6d6d6
| 508383 ||  || — || June 27, 2010 || WISE || WISE ||  || align=right | 2.8 km || 
|-id=384 bgcolor=#fefefe
| 508384 ||  || — || April 11, 2005 || Mount Lemmon || Mount Lemmon Survey ||  || align=right data-sort-value="0.91" | 910 m || 
|-id=385 bgcolor=#d6d6d6
| 508385 ||  || — || March 31, 2016 || Haleakala || Pan-STARRS ||  || align=right | 2.4 km || 
|-id=386 bgcolor=#E9E9E9
| 508386 ||  || — || March 31, 2016 || Haleakala || Pan-STARRS ||  || align=right | 1.3 km || 
|-id=387 bgcolor=#E9E9E9
| 508387 ||  || — || March 25, 2007 || Mount Lemmon || Mount Lemmon Survey ||  || align=right | 2.0 km || 
|-id=388 bgcolor=#fefefe
| 508388 ||  || — || October 30, 2007 || Catalina || CSS ||  || align=right | 1.1 km || 
|-id=389 bgcolor=#fefefe
| 508389 ||  || — || February 9, 2016 || Haleakala || Pan-STARRS ||  || align=right data-sort-value="0.75" | 750 m || 
|-id=390 bgcolor=#fefefe
| 508390 ||  || — || August 12, 2010 || Kitt Peak || Spacewatch ||  || align=right data-sort-value="0.69" | 690 m || 
|-id=391 bgcolor=#fefefe
| 508391 ||  || — || April 27, 2009 || Kitt Peak || Spacewatch ||  || align=right data-sort-value="0.72" | 720 m || 
|-id=392 bgcolor=#fefefe
| 508392 ||  || — || March 18, 2009 || Kitt Peak || Spacewatch ||  || align=right data-sort-value="0.71" | 710 m || 
|-id=393 bgcolor=#fefefe
| 508393 ||  || — || March 7, 2008 || Catalina || CSS ||  || align=right | 1.3 km || 
|-id=394 bgcolor=#E9E9E9
| 508394 ||  || — || June 7, 2008 || Siding Spring || SSS ||  || align=right | 1.6 km || 
|-id=395 bgcolor=#fefefe
| 508395 ||  || — || April 11, 2003 || Kitt Peak || Spacewatch ||  || align=right data-sort-value="0.85" | 850 m || 
|-id=396 bgcolor=#fefefe
| 508396 ||  || — || October 9, 2007 || Kitt Peak || Spacewatch ||  || align=right data-sort-value="0.68" | 680 m || 
|-id=397 bgcolor=#fefefe
| 508397 ||  || — || August 19, 2010 || XuYi || PMO NEO ||  || align=right data-sort-value="0.66" | 660 m || 
|-id=398 bgcolor=#E9E9E9
| 508398 ||  || — || November 9, 2009 || Kitt Peak || Spacewatch ||  || align=right | 2.1 km || 
|-id=399 bgcolor=#fefefe
| 508399 ||  || — || February 13, 2016 || Haleakala || Pan-STARRS ||  || align=right data-sort-value="0.97" | 970 m || 
|-id=400 bgcolor=#fefefe
| 508400 ||  || — || September 17, 2006 || Kitt Peak || Spacewatch ||  || align=right data-sort-value="0.69" | 690 m || 
|}

508401–508500 

|-bgcolor=#E9E9E9
| 508401 ||  || — || January 18, 2015 || Mount Lemmon || Mount Lemmon Survey ||  || align=right | 1.3 km || 
|-id=402 bgcolor=#E9E9E9
| 508402 ||  || — || October 25, 2013 || Mount Lemmon || Mount Lemmon Survey ||  || align=right data-sort-value="0.82" | 820 m || 
|-id=403 bgcolor=#fefefe
| 508403 ||  || — || September 14, 2007 || Mount Lemmon || Mount Lemmon Survey ||  || align=right data-sort-value="0.74" | 740 m || 
|-id=404 bgcolor=#fefefe
| 508404 ||  || — || September 1, 2013 || Mount Lemmon || Mount Lemmon Survey ||  || align=right data-sort-value="0.67" | 670 m || 
|-id=405 bgcolor=#fefefe
| 508405 ||  || — || March 17, 2013 || Catalina || CSS || H || align=right data-sort-value="0.72" | 720 m || 
|-id=406 bgcolor=#E9E9E9
| 508406 ||  || — || August 10, 2012 || Kitt Peak || Spacewatch ||  || align=right | 1.9 km || 
|-id=407 bgcolor=#E9E9E9
| 508407 ||  || — || October 29, 2005 || Mount Lemmon || Mount Lemmon Survey ||  || align=right | 1.3 km || 
|-id=408 bgcolor=#E9E9E9
| 508408 ||  || — || December 14, 2001 || Socorro || LINEAR ||  || align=right | 1.2 km || 
|-id=409 bgcolor=#fefefe
| 508409 ||  || — || March 17, 2012 || Mount Lemmon || Mount Lemmon Survey ||  || align=right data-sort-value="0.73" | 730 m || 
|-id=410 bgcolor=#d6d6d6
| 508410 ||  || — || December 11, 2012 || Mount Lemmon || Mount Lemmon Survey ||  || align=right | 2.8 km || 
|-id=411 bgcolor=#fefefe
| 508411 ||  || — || April 30, 2006 || Kitt Peak || Spacewatch || H || align=right data-sort-value="0.53" | 530 m || 
|-id=412 bgcolor=#fefefe
| 508412 ||  || — || December 29, 2003 || Kitt Peak || Spacewatch ||  || align=right | 1.1 km || 
|-id=413 bgcolor=#fefefe
| 508413 ||  || — || June 17, 2009 || Kitt Peak || Spacewatch ||  || align=right data-sort-value="0.72" | 720 m || 
|-id=414 bgcolor=#fefefe
| 508414 ||  || — || February 16, 2012 || Haleakala || Pan-STARRS ||  || align=right data-sort-value="0.62" | 620 m || 
|-id=415 bgcolor=#E9E9E9
| 508415 ||  || — || August 16, 2012 || Siding Spring || SSS ||  || align=right | 2.1 km || 
|-id=416 bgcolor=#E9E9E9
| 508416 ||  || — || January 30, 2011 || Mount Lemmon || Mount Lemmon Survey ||  || align=right | 1.2 km || 
|-id=417 bgcolor=#d6d6d6
| 508417 ||  || — || March 17, 2016 || Haleakala || Pan-STARRS ||  || align=right | 2.8 km || 
|-id=418 bgcolor=#E9E9E9
| 508418 ||  || — || March 16, 2007 || Mount Lemmon || Mount Lemmon Survey ||  || align=right | 2.6 km || 
|-id=419 bgcolor=#fefefe
| 508419 ||  || — || March 16, 2012 || Mount Lemmon || Mount Lemmon Survey ||  || align=right data-sort-value="0.88" | 880 m || 
|-id=420 bgcolor=#fefefe
| 508420 ||  || — || June 20, 2013 || Haleakala || Pan-STARRS ||  || align=right data-sort-value="0.74" | 740 m || 
|-id=421 bgcolor=#fefefe
| 508421 ||  || — || October 22, 2003 || Kitt Peak || Spacewatch ||  || align=right data-sort-value="0.95" | 950 m || 
|-id=422 bgcolor=#E9E9E9
| 508422 ||  || — || September 14, 2013 || Mount Lemmon || Mount Lemmon Survey ||  || align=right | 1.5 km || 
|-id=423 bgcolor=#E9E9E9
| 508423 ||  || — || April 18, 2007 || Catalina || CSS ||  || align=right | 1.7 km || 
|-id=424 bgcolor=#E9E9E9
| 508424 ||  || — || March 10, 2011 || Mount Lemmon || Mount Lemmon Survey ||  || align=right | 1.7 km || 
|-id=425 bgcolor=#E9E9E9
| 508425 ||  || — || May 11, 2003 || Kitt Peak || Spacewatch ||  || align=right | 2.3 km || 
|-id=426 bgcolor=#E9E9E9
| 508426 ||  || — || January 30, 2011 || Haleakala || Pan-STARRS ||  || align=right | 1.6 km || 
|-id=427 bgcolor=#E9E9E9
| 508427 ||  || — || August 2, 2008 || Siding Spring || SSS ||  || align=right | 1.8 km || 
|-id=428 bgcolor=#FA8072
| 508428 ||  || — || February 22, 2009 || Kitt Peak || Spacewatch ||  || align=right data-sort-value="0.62" | 620 m || 
|-id=429 bgcolor=#fefefe
| 508429 ||  || — || October 2, 2014 || Catalina || CSS || H || align=right data-sort-value="0.65" | 650 m || 
|-id=430 bgcolor=#d6d6d6
| 508430 ||  || — || August 24, 2011 || Haleakala || Pan-STARRS ||  || align=right | 2.3 km || 
|-id=431 bgcolor=#E9E9E9
| 508431 ||  || — || May 2, 2016 || Haleakala || Pan-STARRS ||  || align=right | 1.9 km || 
|-id=432 bgcolor=#E9E9E9
| 508432 ||  || — || September 8, 2008 || Siding Spring || SSS ||  || align=right | 1.9 km || 
|-id=433 bgcolor=#E9E9E9
| 508433 ||  || — || April 3, 2016 || Haleakala || Pan-STARRS ||  || align=right | 1.1 km || 
|-id=434 bgcolor=#E9E9E9
| 508434 ||  || — || July 11, 2004 || Socorro || LINEAR ||  || align=right | 1.4 km || 
|-id=435 bgcolor=#fefefe
| 508435 ||  || — || May 24, 2011 || Mount Lemmon || Mount Lemmon Survey || H || align=right data-sort-value="0.57" | 570 m || 
|-id=436 bgcolor=#E9E9E9
| 508436 ||  || — || January 23, 2006 || Mount Lemmon || Mount Lemmon Survey ||  || align=right | 2.1 km || 
|-id=437 bgcolor=#E9E9E9
| 508437 ||  || — || September 21, 2008 || Catalina || CSS ||  || align=right | 1.8 km || 
|-id=438 bgcolor=#E9E9E9
| 508438 ||  || — || April 10, 2016 || Haleakala || Pan-STARRS ||  || align=right | 1.4 km || 
|-id=439 bgcolor=#d6d6d6
| 508439 ||  || — || April 10, 2016 || Haleakala || Pan-STARRS ||  || align=right | 2.6 km || 
|-id=440 bgcolor=#E9E9E9
| 508440 ||  || — || November 10, 2013 || Mount Lemmon || Mount Lemmon Survey ||  || align=right data-sort-value="0.81" | 810 m || 
|-id=441 bgcolor=#fefefe
| 508441 ||  || — || May 8, 2005 || Mount Lemmon || Mount Lemmon Survey ||  || align=right data-sort-value="0.66" | 660 m || 
|-id=442 bgcolor=#E9E9E9
| 508442 ||  || — || January 20, 2015 || Haleakala || Pan-STARRS ||  || align=right | 1.9 km || 
|-id=443 bgcolor=#E9E9E9
| 508443 ||  || — || April 4, 2016 || Haleakala || Pan-STARRS ||  || align=right | 1.4 km || 
|-id=444 bgcolor=#d6d6d6
| 508444 ||  || — || August 16, 2009 || Kitt Peak || Spacewatch || Tj (2.95) || align=right | 2.2 km || 
|-id=445 bgcolor=#fefefe
| 508445 ||  || — || May 15, 2012 || Mount Lemmon || Mount Lemmon Survey ||  || align=right data-sort-value="0.75" | 750 m || 
|-id=446 bgcolor=#fefefe
| 508446 ||  || — || February 8, 2008 || Kitt Peak || Spacewatch ||  || align=right data-sort-value="0.68" | 680 m || 
|-id=447 bgcolor=#E9E9E9
| 508447 ||  || — || March 1, 2011 || Catalina || CSS ||  || align=right | 1.1 km || 
|-id=448 bgcolor=#d6d6d6
| 508448 ||  || — || April 25, 2004 || Kitt Peak || Spacewatch ||  || align=right | 2.4 km || 
|-id=449 bgcolor=#d6d6d6
| 508449 ||  || — || June 5, 2011 || Kitt Peak || Spacewatch ||  || align=right | 1.8 km || 
|-id=450 bgcolor=#d6d6d6
| 508450 ||  || — || July 24, 2011 || Haleakala || Pan-STARRS ||  || align=right | 2.4 km || 
|-id=451 bgcolor=#E9E9E9
| 508451 ||  || — || November 29, 2013 || Haleakala || Pan-STARRS ||  || align=right | 1.3 km || 
|-id=452 bgcolor=#E9E9E9
| 508452 ||  || — || January 30, 2011 || Mount Lemmon || Mount Lemmon Survey ||  || align=right | 1.0 km || 
|-id=453 bgcolor=#FA8072
| 508453 ||  || — || September 27, 2010 || WISE || WISE ||  || align=right | 1.1 km || 
|-id=454 bgcolor=#E9E9E9
| 508454 ||  || — || January 7, 2010 || Kitt Peak || Spacewatch ||  || align=right | 2.6 km || 
|-id=455 bgcolor=#d6d6d6
| 508455 ||  || — || September 25, 2006 || Catalina || CSS ||  || align=right | 3.8 km || 
|-id=456 bgcolor=#E9E9E9
| 508456 ||  || — || April 23, 2007 || Kitt Peak || Spacewatch ||  || align=right | 1.2 km || 
|-id=457 bgcolor=#E9E9E9
| 508457 ||  || — || November 28, 2013 || Kitt Peak || Spacewatch ||  || align=right | 1.8 km || 
|-id=458 bgcolor=#E9E9E9
| 508458 ||  || — || January 24, 2015 || Haleakala || Pan-STARRS ||  || align=right | 1.7 km || 
|-id=459 bgcolor=#E9E9E9
| 508459 ||  || — || June 29, 2008 || Siding Spring || SSS ||  || align=right | 1.8 km || 
|-id=460 bgcolor=#E9E9E9
| 508460 ||  || — || October 6, 2012 || Haleakala || Pan-STARRS ||  || align=right | 1.9 km || 
|-id=461 bgcolor=#fefefe
| 508461 ||  || — || January 12, 2008 || Mount Lemmon || Mount Lemmon Survey ||  || align=right data-sort-value="0.81" | 810 m || 
|-id=462 bgcolor=#d6d6d6
| 508462 ||  || — || February 28, 2009 || Mount Lemmon || Mount Lemmon Survey ||  || align=right | 3.1 km || 
|-id=463 bgcolor=#E9E9E9
| 508463 ||  || — || November 2, 2008 || Kitt Peak || Spacewatch ||  || align=right | 2.1 km || 
|-id=464 bgcolor=#E9E9E9
| 508464 ||  || — || February 16, 2010 || Kitt Peak || Spacewatch ||  || align=right | 1.8 km || 
|-id=465 bgcolor=#d6d6d6
| 508465 ||  || — || February 28, 2014 || Haleakala || Pan-STARRS ||  || align=right | 2.4 km || 
|-id=466 bgcolor=#d6d6d6
| 508466 ||  || — || March 28, 2015 || Haleakala || Pan-STARRS ||  || align=right | 2.5 km || 
|-id=467 bgcolor=#E9E9E9
| 508467 ||  || — || February 20, 2014 || Mount Lemmon || Mount Lemmon Survey ||  || align=right | 1.5 km || 
|-id=468 bgcolor=#E9E9E9
| 508468 ||  || — || April 14, 2007 || Mount Lemmon || Mount Lemmon Survey ||  || align=right | 1.3 km || 
|-id=469 bgcolor=#E9E9E9
| 508469 ||  || — || July 14, 2016 || Haleakala || Pan-STARRS ||  || align=right | 1.7 km || 
|-id=470 bgcolor=#d6d6d6
| 508470 ||  || — || December 18, 2007 || Mount Lemmon || Mount Lemmon Survey ||  || align=right | 3.0 km || 
|-id=471 bgcolor=#d6d6d6
| 508471 ||  || — || January 13, 2008 || Mount Lemmon || Mount Lemmon Survey ||  || align=right | 2.9 km || 
|-id=472 bgcolor=#E9E9E9
| 508472 ||  || — || February 13, 2010 || Catalina || CSS ||  || align=right | 1.3 km || 
|-id=473 bgcolor=#E9E9E9
| 508473 ||  || — || October 7, 2008 || Mount Lemmon || Mount Lemmon Survey ||  || align=right | 1.7 km || 
|-id=474 bgcolor=#E9E9E9
| 508474 ||  || — || September 6, 2008 || Mount Lemmon || Mount Lemmon Survey ||  || align=right | 1.6 km || 
|-id=475 bgcolor=#E9E9E9
| 508475 ||  || — || April 19, 2007 || Kitt Peak || Spacewatch ||  || align=right | 1.1 km || 
|-id=476 bgcolor=#E9E9E9
| 508476 ||  || — || November 6, 2013 || Haleakala || Pan-STARRS ||  || align=right | 1.4 km || 
|-id=477 bgcolor=#d6d6d6
| 508477 ||  || — || December 12, 2012 || Mount Lemmon || Mount Lemmon Survey ||  || align=right | 2.7 km || 
|-id=478 bgcolor=#E9E9E9
| 508478 ||  || — || October 2, 2008 || Kitt Peak || Spacewatch ||  || align=right | 1.5 km || 
|-id=479 bgcolor=#E9E9E9
| 508479 ||  || — || May 8, 2006 || Kitt Peak || Spacewatch ||  || align=right | 2.0 km || 
|-id=480 bgcolor=#d6d6d6
| 508480 ||  || — || May 3, 2010 || Kitt Peak || Spacewatch ||  || align=right | 2.7 km || 
|-id=481 bgcolor=#d6d6d6
| 508481 ||  || — || December 30, 2007 || Mount Lemmon || Mount Lemmon Survey ||  || align=right | 3.0 km || 
|-id=482 bgcolor=#d6d6d6
| 508482 ||  || — || September 8, 2011 || Haleakala || Pan-STARRS ||  || align=right | 3.3 km || 
|-id=483 bgcolor=#E9E9E9
| 508483 ||  || — || March 25, 2015 || Haleakala || Pan-STARRS ||  || align=right | 1.6 km || 
|-id=484 bgcolor=#d6d6d6
| 508484 ||  || — || March 13, 2010 || WISE || WISE ||  || align=right | 3.8 km || 
|-id=485 bgcolor=#d6d6d6
| 508485 ||  || — || February 13, 2008 || Kitt Peak || Spacewatch ||  || align=right | 3.0 km || 
|-id=486 bgcolor=#E9E9E9
| 508486 ||  || — || October 22, 2003 || Kitt Peak || Spacewatch ||  || align=right | 3.0 km || 
|-id=487 bgcolor=#d6d6d6
| 508487 ||  || — || May 25, 2015 || Haleakala || Pan-STARRS ||  || align=right | 2.3 km || 
|-id=488 bgcolor=#d6d6d6
| 508488 ||  || — || April 20, 2015 || Haleakala || Pan-STARRS ||  || align=right | 2.0 km || 
|-id=489 bgcolor=#d6d6d6
| 508489 ||  || — || January 31, 2008 || Catalina || CSS ||  || align=right | 2.7 km || 
|-id=490 bgcolor=#E9E9E9
| 508490 ||  || — || December 30, 2008 || Kitt Peak || Spacewatch ||  || align=right | 2.2 km || 
|-id=491 bgcolor=#d6d6d6
| 508491 ||  || — || August 3, 2004 || Siding Spring || SSS ||  || align=right | 3.5 km || 
|-id=492 bgcolor=#E9E9E9
| 508492 ||  || — || September 18, 1998 || Kitt Peak || Spacewatch ||  || align=right | 1.9 km || 
|-id=493 bgcolor=#d6d6d6
| 508493 ||  || — || April 25, 2015 || Haleakala || Pan-STARRS ||  || align=right | 1.8 km || 
|-id=494 bgcolor=#E9E9E9
| 508494 ||  || — || October 7, 2007 || Mount Lemmon || Mount Lemmon Survey ||  || align=right | 2.3 km || 
|-id=495 bgcolor=#d6d6d6
| 508495 ||  || — || October 25, 2005 || Mount Lemmon || Mount Lemmon Survey ||  || align=right | 2.5 km || 
|-id=496 bgcolor=#d6d6d6
| 508496 ||  || — || June 18, 2010 || Mount Lemmon || Mount Lemmon Survey ||  || align=right | 3.8 km || 
|-id=497 bgcolor=#d6d6d6
| 508497 ||  || — || October 1, 2011 || Kitt Peak || Spacewatch ||  || align=right | 2.9 km || 
|-id=498 bgcolor=#fefefe
| 508498 ||  || — || May 14, 2008 || Mount Lemmon || Mount Lemmon Survey ||  || align=right data-sort-value="0.77" | 770 m || 
|-id=499 bgcolor=#d6d6d6
| 508499 ||  || — || October 18, 2011 || Haleakala || Pan-STARRS ||  || align=right | 3.0 km || 
|-id=500 bgcolor=#d6d6d6
| 508500 ||  || — || December 31, 2007 || Mount Lemmon || Mount Lemmon Survey ||  || align=right | 2.7 km || 
|}

508501–508600 

|-bgcolor=#d6d6d6
| 508501 ||  || — || September 25, 1995 || Kitt Peak || Spacewatch ||  || align=right | 2.7 km || 
|-id=502 bgcolor=#d6d6d6
| 508502 ||  || — || December 5, 2007 || Mount Lemmon || Mount Lemmon Survey ||  || align=right | 2.9 km || 
|-id=503 bgcolor=#E9E9E9
| 508503 ||  || — || October 21, 2012 || Kitt Peak || Spacewatch ||  || align=right | 2.2 km || 
|-id=504 bgcolor=#d6d6d6
| 508504 ||  || — || November 4, 2007 || Mount Lemmon || Mount Lemmon Survey ||  || align=right | 3.8 km || 
|-id=505 bgcolor=#d6d6d6
| 508505 ||  || — || April 20, 2010 || WISE || WISE ||  || align=right | 3.6 km || 
|-id=506 bgcolor=#E9E9E9
| 508506 ||  || — || February 1, 2006 || Mount Lemmon || Mount Lemmon Survey ||  || align=right | 1.6 km || 
|-id=507 bgcolor=#d6d6d6
| 508507 ||  || — || October 1, 2005 || Catalina || CSS ||  || align=right | 4.1 km || 
|-id=508 bgcolor=#d6d6d6
| 508508 ||  || — || February 26, 2014 || Mount Lemmon || Mount Lemmon Survey ||  || align=right | 2.3 km || 
|-id=509 bgcolor=#d6d6d6
| 508509 ||  || — || November 19, 2006 || Kitt Peak || Spacewatch ||  || align=right | 2.4 km || 
|-id=510 bgcolor=#d6d6d6
| 508510 ||  || — || February 28, 2010 || WISE || WISE ||  || align=right | 3.1 km || 
|-id=511 bgcolor=#d6d6d6
| 508511 ||  || — || October 23, 2011 || Mount Lemmon || Mount Lemmon Survey ||  || align=right | 3.1 km || 
|-id=512 bgcolor=#d6d6d6
| 508512 ||  || — || March 7, 2008 || Mount Lemmon || Mount Lemmon Survey ||  || align=right | 2.4 km || 
|-id=513 bgcolor=#d6d6d6
| 508513 ||  || — || October 13, 2006 || Kitt Peak || Spacewatch ||  || align=right | 2.8 km || 
|-id=514 bgcolor=#E9E9E9
| 508514 ||  || — || October 18, 2003 || Kitt Peak || Spacewatch ||  || align=right | 2.3 km || 
|-id=515 bgcolor=#d6d6d6
| 508515 ||  || — || March 31, 2009 || Kitt Peak || Spacewatch ||  || align=right | 3.2 km || 
|-id=516 bgcolor=#d6d6d6
| 508516 ||  || — || September 23, 2011 || Kitt Peak || Spacewatch ||  || align=right | 2.4 km || 
|-id=517 bgcolor=#d6d6d6
| 508517 ||  || — || August 29, 2005 || Kitt Peak || Spacewatch ||  || align=right | 2.8 km || 
|-id=518 bgcolor=#d6d6d6
| 508518 ||  || — || July 15, 2005 || Kitt Peak || Spacewatch ||  || align=right | 3.1 km || 
|-id=519 bgcolor=#d6d6d6
| 508519 ||  || — || November 12, 2007 || Mount Lemmon || Mount Lemmon Survey ||  || align=right | 3.2 km || 
|-id=520 bgcolor=#d6d6d6
| 508520 ||  || — || September 14, 2006 || Kitt Peak || Spacewatch ||  || align=right | 2.6 km || 
|-id=521 bgcolor=#d6d6d6
| 508521 ||  || — || November 30, 2006 || Kitt Peak || Spacewatch ||  || align=right | 4.5 km || 
|-id=522 bgcolor=#d6d6d6
| 508522 ||  || — || April 24, 2010 || WISE || WISE || Tj (2.98) || align=right | 4.5 km || 
|-id=523 bgcolor=#d6d6d6
| 508523 ||  || — || August 29, 2005 || Kitt Peak || Spacewatch ||  || align=right | 3.0 km || 
|-id=524 bgcolor=#d6d6d6
| 508524 ||  || — || March 4, 2008 || Mount Lemmon || Mount Lemmon Survey ||  || align=right | 3.1 km || 
|-id=525 bgcolor=#fefefe
| 508525 ||  || — || March 29, 1995 || Kitt Peak || Spacewatch ||  || align=right | 1.2 km || 
|-id=526 bgcolor=#d6d6d6
| 508526 ||  || — || April 28, 2010 || WISE || WISE ||  || align=right | 3.5 km || 
|-id=527 bgcolor=#E9E9E9
| 508527 ||  || — || September 25, 2012 || Mount Lemmon || Mount Lemmon Survey ||  || align=right | 1.3 km || 
|-id=528 bgcolor=#d6d6d6
| 508528 ||  || — || February 18, 2015 || Haleakala || Pan-STARRS ||  || align=right | 3.1 km || 
|-id=529 bgcolor=#E9E9E9
| 508529 ||  || — || March 12, 2010 || Kitt Peak || Spacewatch ||  || align=right | 2.0 km || 
|-id=530 bgcolor=#E9E9E9
| 508530 ||  || — || October 18, 2012 || Haleakala || Pan-STARRS ||  || align=right | 1.9 km || 
|-id=531 bgcolor=#d6d6d6
| 508531 ||  || — || August 28, 2005 || Kitt Peak || Spacewatch ||  || align=right | 3.0 km || 
|-id=532 bgcolor=#E9E9E9
| 508532 ||  || — || February 11, 2014 || Catalina || CSS ||  || align=right | 1.6 km || 
|-id=533 bgcolor=#fefefe
| 508533 ||  || — || November 9, 2009 || Mount Lemmon || Mount Lemmon Survey ||  || align=right data-sort-value="0.83" | 830 m || 
|-id=534 bgcolor=#E9E9E9
| 508534 ||  || — || May 25, 2006 || Mount Lemmon || Mount Lemmon Survey ||  || align=right | 1.4 km || 
|-id=535 bgcolor=#E9E9E9
| 508535 ||  || — || March 13, 2014 || Mount Lemmon || Mount Lemmon Survey ||  || align=right | 1.9 km || 
|-id=536 bgcolor=#E9E9E9
| 508536 ||  || — || November 11, 2004 || Catalina || CSS ||  || align=right | 1.6 km || 
|-id=537 bgcolor=#d6d6d6
| 508537 ||  || — || November 2, 2007 || Kitt Peak || Spacewatch ||  || align=right | 3.8 km || 
|-id=538 bgcolor=#d6d6d6
| 508538 ||  || — || October 25, 2011 || Haleakala || Pan-STARRS ||  || align=right | 3.6 km || 
|-id=539 bgcolor=#E9E9E9
| 508539 ||  || — || March 19, 2010 || Mount Lemmon || Mount Lemmon Survey ||  || align=right | 1.8 km || 
|-id=540 bgcolor=#d6d6d6
| 508540 ||  || — || January 23, 2015 || Haleakala || Pan-STARRS ||  || align=right | 2.8 km || 
|-id=541 bgcolor=#d6d6d6
| 508541 ||  || — || September 14, 2006 || Kitt Peak || Spacewatch ||  || align=right | 2.5 km || 
|-id=542 bgcolor=#d6d6d6
| 508542 ||  || — || February 27, 2000 || Kitt Peak || Spacewatch || 7:4 || align=right | 4.8 km || 
|-id=543 bgcolor=#E9E9E9
| 508543 ||  || — || November 14, 2007 || Kitt Peak || Spacewatch ||  || align=right | 2.7 km || 
|-id=544 bgcolor=#E9E9E9
| 508544 ||  || — || September 25, 2007 || Mount Lemmon || Mount Lemmon Survey ||  || align=right | 3.7 km || 
|-id=545 bgcolor=#d6d6d6
| 508545 ||  || — || April 29, 2009 || Siding Spring || SSS ||  || align=right | 3.9 km || 
|-id=546 bgcolor=#d6d6d6
| 508546 ||  || — || October 11, 2005 || Kitt Peak || Spacewatch ||  || align=right | 2.5 km || 
|-id=547 bgcolor=#d6d6d6
| 508547 ||  || — || March 6, 2008 || Mount Lemmon || Mount Lemmon Survey ||  || align=right | 3.0 km || 
|-id=548 bgcolor=#d6d6d6
| 508548 ||  || — || March 19, 2009 || Kitt Peak || Spacewatch ||  || align=right | 3.1 km || 
|-id=549 bgcolor=#E9E9E9
| 508549 ||  || — || November 12, 2012 || Kitt Peak || Spacewatch ||  || align=right | 2.2 km || 
|-id=550 bgcolor=#d6d6d6
| 508550 ||  || — || July 12, 2010 || WISE || WISE ||  || align=right | 3.2 km || 
|-id=551 bgcolor=#d6d6d6
| 508551 ||  || — || September 10, 2010 || Kitt Peak || Spacewatch ||  || align=right | 2.8 km || 
|-id=552 bgcolor=#E9E9E9
| 508552 ||  || — || December 28, 2003 || Kitt Peak || Spacewatch ||  || align=right | 2.9 km || 
|-id=553 bgcolor=#d6d6d6
| 508553 ||  || — || July 12, 2010 || WISE || WISE ||  || align=right | 4.5 km || 
|-id=554 bgcolor=#E9E9E9
| 508554 ||  || — || March 9, 2005 || Kitt Peak || Spacewatch ||  || align=right | 2.7 km || 
|-id=555 bgcolor=#d6d6d6
| 508555 ||  || — || January 2, 2001 || Socorro || LINEAR ||  || align=right | 3.8 km || 
|-id=556 bgcolor=#E9E9E9
| 508556 ||  || — || March 27, 2000 || Kitt Peak || Spacewatch ||  || align=right | 2.9 km || 
|-id=557 bgcolor=#d6d6d6
| 508557 ||  || — || December 6, 2002 || Socorro || LINEAR ||  || align=right | 2.7 km || 
|-id=558 bgcolor=#E9E9E9
| 508558 ||  || — || October 29, 2008 || Kitt Peak || Spacewatch ||  || align=right | 1.2 km || 
|-id=559 bgcolor=#d6d6d6
| 508559 ||  || — || October 26, 2005 || Kitt Peak || Spacewatch ||  || align=right | 3.1 km || 
|-id=560 bgcolor=#E9E9E9
| 508560 ||  || — || October 30, 2008 || Catalina || CSS || EUN || align=right | 1.3 km || 
|-id=561 bgcolor=#d6d6d6
| 508561 ||  || — || October 26, 2005 || Kitt Peak || Spacewatch || VER || align=right | 2.9 km || 
|-id=562 bgcolor=#d6d6d6
| 508562 ||  || — || April 11, 2010 || WISE || WISE ||  || align=right | 4.2 km || 
|-id=563 bgcolor=#d6d6d6
| 508563 ||  || — || February 22, 2007 || Kitt Peak || Spacewatch ||  || align=right | 2.9 km || 
|-id=564 bgcolor=#d6d6d6
| 508564 ||  || — || February 22, 2007 || Kitt Peak || Spacewatch ||  || align=right | 3.0 km || 
|-id=565 bgcolor=#d6d6d6
| 508565 ||  || — || July 17, 2009 || La Sagra || OAM Obs. ||  || align=right | 3.8 km || 
|-id=566 bgcolor=#d6d6d6
| 508566 ||  || — || December 13, 2006 || Kitt Peak || Spacewatch ||  || align=right | 3.2 km || 
|-id=567 bgcolor=#E9E9E9
| 508567 ||  || — || June 24, 1995 || Kitt Peak || Spacewatch ||  || align=right | 1.6 km || 
|-id=568 bgcolor=#d6d6d6
| 508568 ||  || — || March 29, 2008 || Mount Lemmon || Mount Lemmon Survey ||  || align=right | 4.4 km || 
|-id=569 bgcolor=#fefefe
| 508569 ||  || — || March 12, 2013 || Catalina || CSS ||  || align=right data-sort-value="0.78" | 780 m || 
|-id=570 bgcolor=#E9E9E9
| 508570 ||  || — || June 14, 2009 || Mount Lemmon || Mount Lemmon Survey ||  || align=right data-sort-value="0.83" | 830 m || 
|-id=571 bgcolor=#E9E9E9
| 508571 ||  || — || September 2, 2008 || La Sagra || OAM Obs. ||  || align=right | 2.1 km || 
|-id=572 bgcolor=#E9E9E9
| 508572 ||  || — || September 27, 2009 || Mount Lemmon || Mount Lemmon Survey ||  || align=right data-sort-value="0.87" | 870 m || 
|-id=573 bgcolor=#E9E9E9
| 508573 ||  || — || January 30, 2011 || Haleakala || Pan-STARRS ||  || align=right | 1.8 km || 
|-id=574 bgcolor=#d6d6d6
| 508574 ||  || — || February 13, 2010 || WISE || WISE ||  || align=right | 3.7 km || 
|-id=575 bgcolor=#fefefe
| 508575 ||  || — || August 27, 1998 || Kitt Peak || Spacewatch ||  || align=right data-sort-value="0.90" | 900 m || 
|-id=576 bgcolor=#d6d6d6
| 508576 ||  || — || October 15, 2007 || Mount Lemmon || Mount Lemmon Survey ||  || align=right | 2.5 km || 
|-id=577 bgcolor=#d6d6d6
| 508577 ||  || — || February 3, 2009 || Kitt Peak || Spacewatch ||  || align=right | 3.4 km || 
|-id=578 bgcolor=#d6d6d6
| 508578 ||  || — || October 10, 2007 || Mount Lemmon || Mount Lemmon Survey ||  || align=right | 2.3 km || 
|-id=579 bgcolor=#d6d6d6
| 508579 ||  || — || April 4, 2010 || WISE || WISE ||  || align=right | 3.7 km || 
|-id=580 bgcolor=#d6d6d6
| 508580 ||  || — || August 28, 2001 || Kitt Peak || Spacewatch ||  || align=right | 2.2 km || 
|-id=581 bgcolor=#fefefe
| 508581 ||  || — || February 28, 2009 || Kitt Peak || Spacewatch ||  || align=right data-sort-value="0.86" | 860 m || 
|-id=582 bgcolor=#E9E9E9
| 508582 ||  || — || September 25, 1995 || Kitt Peak || Spacewatch ||  || align=right | 1.4 km || 
|-id=583 bgcolor=#d6d6d6
| 508583 ||  || — || October 20, 2006 || Kitt Peak || Spacewatch ||  || align=right | 2.7 km || 
|-id=584 bgcolor=#E9E9E9
| 508584 ||  || — || May 15, 2004 || Campo Imperatore || CINEOS ||  || align=right | 2.4 km || 
|-id=585 bgcolor=#fefefe
| 508585 ||  || — || February 2, 2009 || Kitt Peak || Spacewatch ||  || align=right data-sort-value="0.84" | 840 m || 
|-id=586 bgcolor=#d6d6d6
| 508586 ||  || — || December 14, 2013 || Mount Lemmon || Mount Lemmon Survey ||  || align=right | 3.1 km || 
|-id=587 bgcolor=#d6d6d6
| 508587 ||  || — || September 28, 2006 || Catalina || CSS ||  || align=right | 3.1 km || 
|-id=588 bgcolor=#E9E9E9
| 508588 ||  || — || July 16, 2013 || Haleakala || Pan-STARRS ||  || align=right | 1.2 km || 
|-id=589 bgcolor=#d6d6d6
| 508589 ||  || — || August 26, 2012 || Haleakala || Pan-STARRS ||  || align=right | 2.6 km || 
|-id=590 bgcolor=#E9E9E9
| 508590 ||  || — || May 3, 2008 || Mount Lemmon || Mount Lemmon Survey ||  || align=right | 1.1 km || 
|-id=591 bgcolor=#E9E9E9
| 508591 ||  || — || December 3, 1996 || Kitt Peak || Spacewatch ||  || align=right | 1.3 km || 
|-id=592 bgcolor=#fefefe
| 508592 ||  || — || April 21, 1996 || Kitt Peak || Spacewatch ||  || align=right data-sort-value="0.80" | 800 m || 
|-id=593 bgcolor=#fefefe
| 508593 ||  || — || December 6, 2010 || Kitt Peak || Spacewatch ||  || align=right data-sort-value="0.88" | 880 m || 
|-id=594 bgcolor=#FA8072
| 508594 ||  || — || September 3, 2007 || Catalina || CSS ||  || align=right data-sort-value="0.52" | 520 m || 
|-id=595 bgcolor=#E9E9E9
| 508595 ||  || — || March 25, 2012 || Mount Lemmon || Mount Lemmon Survey ||  || align=right data-sort-value="0.99" | 990 m || 
|-id=596 bgcolor=#fefefe
| 508596 ||  || — || December 18, 2014 || Haleakala || Pan-STARRS ||  || align=right data-sort-value="0.98" | 980 m || 
|-id=597 bgcolor=#fefefe
| 508597 ||  || — || November 2, 2007 || Mount Lemmon || Mount Lemmon Survey ||  || align=right data-sort-value="0.69" | 690 m || 
|-id=598 bgcolor=#E9E9E9
| 508598 ||  || — || October 4, 2004 || Kitt Peak || Spacewatch ||  || align=right | 1.9 km || 
|-id=599 bgcolor=#E9E9E9
| 508599 ||  || — || September 15, 2013 || Haleakala || Pan-STARRS ||  || align=right | 1.2 km || 
|-id=600 bgcolor=#fefefe
| 508600 ||  || — || January 14, 2016 || Haleakala || Pan-STARRS ||  || align=right data-sort-value="0.85" | 850 m || 
|}

508601–508700 

|-bgcolor=#E9E9E9
| 508601 ||  || — || September 3, 2008 || Kitt Peak || Spacewatch ||  || align=right | 2.0 km || 
|-id=602 bgcolor=#d6d6d6
| 508602 ||  || — || April 7, 2006 || Kitt Peak || Spacewatch ||  || align=right | 2.4 km || 
|-id=603 bgcolor=#d6d6d6
| 508603 ||  || — || October 19, 2006 || Catalina || CSS ||  || align=right | 3.2 km || 
|-id=604 bgcolor=#E9E9E9
| 508604 ||  || — || October 11, 2004 || Kitt Peak || Spacewatch ||  || align=right | 1.5 km || 
|-id=605 bgcolor=#fefefe
| 508605 ||  || — || December 6, 2007 || Kitt Peak || Spacewatch ||  || align=right data-sort-value="0.78" | 780 m || 
|-id=606 bgcolor=#E9E9E9
| 508606 ||  || — || August 29, 2000 || Socorro || LINEAR ||  || align=right | 1.7 km || 
|-id=607 bgcolor=#fefefe
| 508607 ||  || — || October 27, 2006 || Catalina || CSS || H || align=right data-sort-value="0.77" | 770 m || 
|-id=608 bgcolor=#fefefe
| 508608 ||  || — || September 20, 2003 || Kitt Peak || Spacewatch ||  || align=right data-sort-value="0.70" | 700 m || 
|-id=609 bgcolor=#E9E9E9
| 508609 ||  || — || July 18, 2013 || Haleakala || Pan-STARRS ||  || align=right | 1.3 km || 
|-id=610 bgcolor=#E9E9E9
| 508610 ||  || — || September 18, 2009 || Kitt Peak || Spacewatch ||  || align=right data-sort-value="0.81" | 810 m || 
|-id=611 bgcolor=#E9E9E9
| 508611 ||  || — || September 4, 2008 || Kitt Peak || Spacewatch ||  || align=right | 2.0 km || 
|-id=612 bgcolor=#E9E9E9
| 508612 ||  || — || September 21, 2009 || Mount Lemmon || Mount Lemmon Survey ||  || align=right | 1.4 km || 
|-id=613 bgcolor=#fefefe
| 508613 ||  || — || October 10, 2007 || Catalina || CSS ||  || align=right data-sort-value="0.90" | 900 m || 
|-id=614 bgcolor=#E9E9E9
| 508614 ||  || — || September 27, 2008 || Mount Lemmon || Mount Lemmon Survey ||  || align=right | 2.1 km || 
|-id=615 bgcolor=#d6d6d6
| 508615 ||  || — || March 23, 2004 || Kitt Peak || Spacewatch ||  || align=right | 2.5 km || 
|-id=616 bgcolor=#E9E9E9
| 508616 ||  || — || November 24, 1997 || Kitt Peak || Spacewatch ||  || align=right data-sort-value="0.97" | 970 m || 
|-id=617 bgcolor=#E9E9E9
| 508617 ||  || — || August 22, 2004 || Kitt Peak || Spacewatch ||  || align=right | 2.0 km || 
|-id=618 bgcolor=#d6d6d6
| 508618 ||  || — || October 8, 2012 || Kitt Peak || Spacewatch ||  || align=right | 3.1 km || 
|-id=619 bgcolor=#E9E9E9
| 508619 ||  || — || March 21, 2010 || Kitt Peak || Spacewatch ||  || align=right | 2.8 km || 
|-id=620 bgcolor=#E9E9E9
| 508620 ||  || — || November 25, 2005 || Mount Lemmon || Mount Lemmon Survey ||  || align=right | 1.7 km || 
|-id=621 bgcolor=#E9E9E9
| 508621 ||  || — || November 24, 2009 || Kitt Peak || Spacewatch ||  || align=right | 1.3 km || 
|-id=622 bgcolor=#d6d6d6
| 508622 ||  || — || March 1, 2009 || Kitt Peak || Spacewatch ||  || align=right | 3.0 km || 
|-id=623 bgcolor=#d6d6d6
| 508623 ||  || — || February 19, 2009 || Kitt Peak || Spacewatch ||  || align=right | 2.9 km || 
|-id=624 bgcolor=#d6d6d6
| 508624 ||  || — || December 4, 2012 || Mount Lemmon || Mount Lemmon Survey ||  || align=right | 3.2 km || 
|-id=625 bgcolor=#d6d6d6
| 508625 ||  || — || May 21, 2006 || Kitt Peak || Spacewatch ||  || align=right | 2.0 km || 
|-id=626 bgcolor=#d6d6d6
| 508626 ||  || — || March 21, 2010 || Mount Lemmon || Mount Lemmon Survey ||  || align=right | 3.1 km || 
|-id=627 bgcolor=#fefefe
| 508627 ||  || — || September 20, 2006 || Catalina || CSS ||  || align=right data-sort-value="0.89" | 890 m || 
|-id=628 bgcolor=#fefefe
| 508628 ||  || — || June 21, 2010 || Mount Lemmon || Mount Lemmon Survey ||  || align=right data-sort-value="0.59" | 590 m || 
|-id=629 bgcolor=#E9E9E9
| 508629 ||  || — || August 6, 2008 || Siding Spring || SSS ||  || align=right | 1.7 km || 
|-id=630 bgcolor=#E9E9E9
| 508630 ||  || — || September 18, 2003 || Kitt Peak || Spacewatch ||  || align=right | 2.1 km || 
|-id=631 bgcolor=#fefefe
| 508631 ||  || — || December 24, 2006 || Mount Lemmon || Mount Lemmon Survey || H || align=right data-sort-value="0.79" | 790 m || 
|-id=632 bgcolor=#E9E9E9
| 508632 ||  || — || October 7, 2004 || Socorro || LINEAR ||  || align=right | 2.0 km || 
|-id=633 bgcolor=#E9E9E9
| 508633 ||  || — || September 18, 2009 || Mount Lemmon || Mount Lemmon Survey ||  || align=right | 1.2 km || 
|-id=634 bgcolor=#E9E9E9
| 508634 ||  || — || October 7, 2008 || Kitt Peak || Spacewatch ||  || align=right | 2.0 km || 
|-id=635 bgcolor=#fefefe
| 508635 ||  || — || November 2, 2010 || Kitt Peak || Spacewatch ||  || align=right data-sort-value="0.78" | 780 m || 
|-id=636 bgcolor=#E9E9E9
| 508636 ||  || — || January 8, 2010 || Catalina || CSS ||  || align=right | 2.9 km || 
|-id=637 bgcolor=#fefefe
| 508637 ||  || — || November 2, 2010 || Mount Lemmon || Mount Lemmon Survey ||  || align=right data-sort-value="0.75" | 750 m || 
|-id=638 bgcolor=#d6d6d6
| 508638 ||  || — || January 19, 2004 || Kitt Peak || Spacewatch ||  || align=right | 2.8 km || 
|-id=639 bgcolor=#fefefe
| 508639 ||  || — || December 14, 2010 || Mount Lemmon || Mount Lemmon Survey ||  || align=right data-sort-value="0.66" | 660 m || 
|-id=640 bgcolor=#fefefe
| 508640 ||  || — || April 17, 2009 || Kitt Peak || Spacewatch ||  || align=right data-sort-value="0.87" | 870 m || 
|-id=641 bgcolor=#d6d6d6
| 508641 ||  || — || October 22, 2008 || Kitt Peak || Spacewatch ||  || align=right | 2.4 km || 
|-id=642 bgcolor=#d6d6d6
| 508642 ||  || — || September 26, 2006 || Mount Lemmon || Mount Lemmon Survey ||  || align=right | 4.5 km || 
|-id=643 bgcolor=#E9E9E9
| 508643 ||  || — || March 20, 2007 || Kitt Peak || Spacewatch ||  || align=right data-sort-value="0.91" | 910 m || 
|-id=644 bgcolor=#fefefe
| 508644 ||  || — || November 21, 2003 || Socorro || LINEAR ||  || align=right data-sort-value="0.79" | 790 m || 
|-id=645 bgcolor=#fefefe
| 508645 ||  || — || September 25, 1998 || Kitt Peak || Spacewatch ||  || align=right data-sort-value="0.56" | 560 m || 
|-id=646 bgcolor=#E9E9E9
| 508646 ||  || — || December 6, 2005 || Kitt Peak || Spacewatch ||  || align=right | 1.2 km || 
|-id=647 bgcolor=#E9E9E9
| 508647 ||  || — || October 25, 2003 || Socorro || LINEAR ||  || align=right | 2.1 km || 
|-id=648 bgcolor=#E9E9E9
| 508648 ||  || — || October 5, 1996 || Kitt Peak || Spacewatch ||  || align=right data-sort-value="0.94" | 940 m || 
|-id=649 bgcolor=#E9E9E9
| 508649 ||  || — || October 2, 2008 || Socorro || LINEAR ||  || align=right | 2.6 km || 
|-id=650 bgcolor=#d6d6d6
| 508650 ||  || — || October 2, 2000 || Socorro || LINEAR ||  || align=right | 3.9 km || 
|-id=651 bgcolor=#d6d6d6
| 508651 ||  || — || May 13, 2005 || Mount Lemmon || Mount Lemmon Survey ||  || align=right | 3.4 km || 
|-id=652 bgcolor=#d6d6d6
| 508652 ||  || — || February 11, 2008 || Mount Lemmon || Mount Lemmon Survey ||  || align=right | 3.7 km || 
|-id=653 bgcolor=#fefefe
| 508653 ||  || — || December 31, 2008 || Mount Lemmon || Mount Lemmon Survey ||  || align=right data-sort-value="0.74" | 740 m || 
|-id=654 bgcolor=#fefefe
| 508654 ||  || — || April 11, 2005 || Kitt Peak || Spacewatch ||  || align=right data-sort-value="0.93" | 930 m || 
|-id=655 bgcolor=#fefefe
| 508655 ||  || — || February 12, 2008 || Mount Lemmon || Mount Lemmon Survey ||  || align=right data-sort-value="0.73" | 730 m || 
|-id=656 bgcolor=#fefefe
| 508656 ||  || — || January 31, 2009 || Kitt Peak || Spacewatch ||  || align=right data-sort-value="0.79" | 790 m || 
|-id=657 bgcolor=#FA8072
| 508657 ||  || — || April 18, 1996 || Kitt Peak || Spacewatch || H || align=right data-sort-value="0.52" | 520 m || 
|-id=658 bgcolor=#E9E9E9
| 508658 ||  || — || October 6, 2000 || Kitt Peak || Spacewatch ||  || align=right data-sort-value="0.74" | 740 m || 
|-id=659 bgcolor=#fefefe
| 508659 ||  || — || October 17, 2006 || Catalina || CSS || H || align=right data-sort-value="0.89" | 890 m || 
|-id=660 bgcolor=#E9E9E9
| 508660 ||  || — || March 9, 2007 || Mount Lemmon || Mount Lemmon Survey ||  || align=right | 1.1 km || 
|-id=661 bgcolor=#fefefe
| 508661 ||  || — || May 26, 2006 || Mount Lemmon || Mount Lemmon Survey || H || align=right data-sort-value="0.74" | 740 m || 
|-id=662 bgcolor=#d6d6d6
| 508662 ||  || — || October 17, 2006 || Kitt Peak || Spacewatch ||  || align=right | 3.2 km || 
|-id=663 bgcolor=#E9E9E9
| 508663 ||  || — || October 1, 2000 || Anderson Mesa || LONEOS ||  || align=right | 1.5 km || 
|-id=664 bgcolor=#fefefe
| 508664 ||  || — || September 30, 2006 || Catalina || CSS ||  || align=right data-sort-value="0.90" | 900 m || 
|-id=665 bgcolor=#E9E9E9
| 508665 ||  || — || October 8, 2004 || Socorro || LINEAR ||  || align=right | 1.9 km || 
|-id=666 bgcolor=#E9E9E9
| 508666 ||  || — || October 1, 2000 || Anderson Mesa || LONEOS ||  || align=right | 2.0 km || 
|-id=667 bgcolor=#d6d6d6
| 508667 ||  || — || December 8, 2001 || Socorro || LINEAR ||  || align=right | 3.0 km || 
|-id=668 bgcolor=#E9E9E9
| 508668 ||  || — || August 26, 2008 || Siding Spring || SSS ||  || align=right | 2.4 km || 
|-id=669 bgcolor=#E9E9E9
| 508669 ||  || — || September 23, 2004 || Kitt Peak || Spacewatch ||  || align=right | 1.4 km || 
|-id=670 bgcolor=#E9E9E9
| 508670 ||  || — || November 21, 2000 || Socorro || LINEAR ||  || align=right | 1.6 km || 
|-id=671 bgcolor=#fefefe
| 508671 ||  || — || November 2, 2006 || Catalina || CSS ||  || align=right data-sort-value="0.97" | 970 m || 
|-id=672 bgcolor=#d6d6d6
| 508672 ||  || — || October 19, 2006 || Catalina || CSS ||  || align=right | 4.4 km || 
|-id=673 bgcolor=#fefefe
| 508673 ||  || — || December 24, 2006 || Kitt Peak || Spacewatch ||  || align=right data-sort-value="0.87" | 870 m || 
|-id=674 bgcolor=#E9E9E9
| 508674 ||  || — || September 28, 2009 || Kitt Peak || Spacewatch ||  || align=right | 1.5 km || 
|-id=675 bgcolor=#E9E9E9
| 508675 ||  || — || March 31, 2003 || Socorro || LINEAR ||  || align=right | 1.9 km || 
|-id=676 bgcolor=#E9E9E9
| 508676 ||  || — || October 9, 2004 || Kitt Peak || Spacewatch ||  || align=right | 2.6 km || 
|-id=677 bgcolor=#E9E9E9
| 508677 ||  || — || September 27, 2008 || Mount Lemmon || Mount Lemmon Survey ||  || align=right | 2.0 km || 
|-id=678 bgcolor=#d6d6d6
| 508678 ||  || — || December 3, 2007 || Kitt Peak || Spacewatch ||  || align=right | 3.0 km || 
|-id=679 bgcolor=#fefefe
| 508679 ||  || — || January 15, 2000 || Kitt Peak || Spacewatch ||  || align=right data-sort-value="0.96" | 960 m || 
|-id=680 bgcolor=#E9E9E9
| 508680 ||  || — || September 30, 2005 || Kitt Peak || Spacewatch ||  || align=right data-sort-value="0.83" | 830 m || 
|-id=681 bgcolor=#E9E9E9
| 508681 ||  || — || October 1, 2005 || Mount Lemmon || Mount Lemmon Survey ||  || align=right data-sort-value="0.82" | 820 m || 
|-id=682 bgcolor=#d6d6d6
| 508682 ||  || — || October 21, 2000 || Kitt Peak || Spacewatch ||  || align=right | 3.1 km || 
|-id=683 bgcolor=#E9E9E9
| 508683 ||  || — || March 30, 2011 || Mount Lemmon || Mount Lemmon Survey ||  || align=right | 1.5 km || 
|-id=684 bgcolor=#fefefe
| 508684 ||  || — || February 9, 2008 || Kitt Peak || Spacewatch ||  || align=right | 1.3 km || 
|-id=685 bgcolor=#E9E9E9
| 508685 ||  || — || October 9, 2004 || Kitt Peak || Spacewatch ||  || align=right | 2.1 km || 
|-id=686 bgcolor=#fefefe
| 508686 ||  || — || August 28, 2006 || Catalina || CSS ||  || align=right data-sort-value="0.62" | 620 m || 
|-id=687 bgcolor=#d6d6d6
| 508687 ||  || — || August 28, 2006 || Kitt Peak || Spacewatch ||  || align=right | 2.2 km || 
|-id=688 bgcolor=#d6d6d6
| 508688 ||  || — || September 27, 2006 || Kitt Peak || Spacewatch ||  || align=right | 2.5 km || 
|-id=689 bgcolor=#E9E9E9
| 508689 ||  || — || September 14, 1998 || Kitt Peak || Spacewatch ||  || align=right | 1.7 km || 
|-id=690 bgcolor=#E9E9E9
| 508690 ||  || — || February 25, 2011 || Mount Lemmon || Mount Lemmon Survey ||  || align=right | 1.9 km || 
|-id=691 bgcolor=#E9E9E9
| 508691 ||  || — || September 29, 2000 || Kitt Peak || Spacewatch ||  || align=right | 2.3 km || 
|-id=692 bgcolor=#E9E9E9
| 508692 ||  || — || September 17, 2009 || Mount Lemmon || Mount Lemmon Survey ||  || align=right data-sort-value="0.76" | 760 m || 
|-id=693 bgcolor=#E9E9E9
| 508693 ||  || — || October 9, 2004 || Kitt Peak || Spacewatch ||  || align=right | 1.6 km || 
|-id=694 bgcolor=#fefefe
| 508694 ||  || — || August 21, 2006 || Kitt Peak || Spacewatch ||  || align=right data-sort-value="0.74" | 740 m || 
|-id=695 bgcolor=#E9E9E9
| 508695 ||  || — || October 27, 2005 || Mount Lemmon || Mount Lemmon Survey ||  || align=right data-sort-value="0.56" | 560 m || 
|-id=696 bgcolor=#E9E9E9
| 508696 ||  || — || October 1, 2005 || Kitt Peak || Spacewatch ||  || align=right data-sort-value="0.82" | 820 m || 
|-id=697 bgcolor=#d6d6d6
| 508697 ||  || — || September 18, 1995 || Kitt Peak || Spacewatch ||  || align=right | 2.6 km || 
|-id=698 bgcolor=#fefefe
| 508698 ||  || — || March 28, 2008 || Mount Lemmon || Mount Lemmon Survey ||  || align=right data-sort-value="0.95" | 950 m || 
|-id=699 bgcolor=#d6d6d6
| 508699 ||  || — || February 27, 2003 || Campo Imperatore || CINEOS ||  || align=right | 3.2 km || 
|-id=700 bgcolor=#d6d6d6
| 508700 ||  || — || September 17, 2006 || Kitt Peak || Spacewatch ||  || align=right | 3.9 km || 
|}

508701–508800 

|-bgcolor=#d6d6d6
| 508701 ||  || — || May 1, 2006 || Catalina || CSS ||  || align=right | 3.3 km || 
|-id=702 bgcolor=#fefefe
| 508702 ||  || — || November 22, 2006 || Mount Lemmon || Mount Lemmon Survey ||  || align=right data-sort-value="0.71" | 710 m || 
|-id=703 bgcolor=#d6d6d6
| 508703 ||  || — || April 5, 2010 || Kitt Peak || Spacewatch ||  || align=right | 2.7 km || 
|-id=704 bgcolor=#d6d6d6
| 508704 ||  || — || August 19, 2006 || Kitt Peak || Spacewatch ||  || align=right | 2.5 km || 
|-id=705 bgcolor=#d6d6d6
| 508705 ||  || — || February 22, 2004 || Kitt Peak || Spacewatch ||  || align=right | 2.3 km || 
|-id=706 bgcolor=#E9E9E9
| 508706 ||  || — || September 6, 2008 || Mount Lemmon || Mount Lemmon Survey ||  || align=right | 1.2 km || 
|-id=707 bgcolor=#d6d6d6
| 508707 ||  || — || November 30, 2003 || Kitt Peak || Spacewatch ||  || align=right | 3.3 km || 
|-id=708 bgcolor=#E9E9E9
| 508708 ||  || — || December 22, 2005 || Kitt Peak || Spacewatch ||  || align=right | 1.4 km || 
|-id=709 bgcolor=#E9E9E9
| 508709 ||  || — || November 21, 2005 || Anderson Mesa || LONEOS ||  || align=right | 1.1 km || 
|-id=710 bgcolor=#E9E9E9
| 508710 ||  || — || January 31, 2006 || Kitt Peak || Spacewatch ||  || align=right | 2.0 km || 
|-id=711 bgcolor=#E9E9E9
| 508711 ||  || — || January 23, 2006 || Mount Lemmon || Mount Lemmon Survey ||  || align=right | 1.5 km || 
|-id=712 bgcolor=#E9E9E9
| 508712 ||  || — || September 23, 2004 || Kitt Peak || Spacewatch ||  || align=right | 1.1 km || 
|-id=713 bgcolor=#fefefe
| 508713 ||  || — || November 10, 2006 || Kitt Peak || Spacewatch ||  || align=right data-sort-value="0.64" | 640 m || 
|-id=714 bgcolor=#d6d6d6
| 508714 ||  || — || June 21, 2011 || Kitt Peak || Spacewatch ||  || align=right | 2.8 km || 
|-id=715 bgcolor=#fefefe
| 508715 ||  || — || December 2, 1994 || Kitt Peak || Spacewatch ||  || align=right data-sort-value="0.67" | 670 m || 
|-id=716 bgcolor=#E9E9E9
| 508716 ||  || — || June 16, 2012 || Mount Lemmon || Mount Lemmon Survey ||  || align=right | 1.5 km || 
|-id=717 bgcolor=#E9E9E9
| 508717 ||  || — || September 11, 2004 || Kitt Peak || Spacewatch ||  || align=right | 1.2 km || 
|-id=718 bgcolor=#fefefe
| 508718 ||  || — || April 13, 2013 || Haleakala || Pan-STARRS ||  || align=right data-sort-value="0.69" | 690 m || 
|-id=719 bgcolor=#E9E9E9
| 508719 ||  || — || November 8, 2009 || Mount Lemmon || Mount Lemmon Survey ||  || align=right data-sort-value="0.69" | 690 m || 
|-id=720 bgcolor=#d6d6d6
| 508720 ||  || — || September 17, 2012 || Mount Lemmon || Mount Lemmon Survey ||  || align=right | 1.7 km || 
|-id=721 bgcolor=#E9E9E9
| 508721 ||  || — || December 13, 2004 || Kitt Peak || Spacewatch ||  || align=right | 1.8 km || 
|-id=722 bgcolor=#d6d6d6
| 508722 ||  || — || October 10, 2007 || Mount Lemmon || Mount Lemmon Survey ||  || align=right | 3.6 km || 
|-id=723 bgcolor=#E9E9E9
| 508723 ||  || — || September 22, 2008 || Kitt Peak || Spacewatch ||  || align=right | 1.7 km || 
|-id=724 bgcolor=#d6d6d6
| 508724 ||  || — || September 12, 2007 || Mount Lemmon || Mount Lemmon Survey ||  || align=right | 2.3 km || 
|-id=725 bgcolor=#E9E9E9
| 508725 ||  || — || October 5, 2003 || Kitt Peak || Spacewatch ||  || align=right | 2.4 km || 
|-id=726 bgcolor=#fefefe
| 508726 ||  || — || August 9, 2013 || Haleakala || Pan-STARRS ||  || align=right data-sort-value="0.63" | 630 m || 
|-id=727 bgcolor=#E9E9E9
| 508727 ||  || — || April 5, 2011 || Kitt Peak || Spacewatch ||  || align=right | 1.5 km || 
|-id=728 bgcolor=#fefefe
| 508728 ||  || — || October 6, 1996 || Kitt Peak || Spacewatch ||  || align=right data-sort-value="0.76" | 760 m || 
|-id=729 bgcolor=#fefefe
| 508729 ||  || — || September 11, 2004 || Kitt Peak || Spacewatch ||  || align=right data-sort-value="0.60" | 600 m || 
|-id=730 bgcolor=#E9E9E9
| 508730 ||  || — || March 27, 2003 || Kitt Peak || Spacewatch ||  || align=right | 1.7 km || 
|-id=731 bgcolor=#E9E9E9
| 508731 ||  || — || March 29, 2011 || Kitt Peak || Spacewatch ||  || align=right | 2.4 km || 
|-id=732 bgcolor=#fefefe
| 508732 ||  || — || January 19, 2004 || Kitt Peak || Spacewatch ||  || align=right data-sort-value="0.50" | 500 m || 
|-id=733 bgcolor=#d6d6d6
| 508733 ||  || — || September 27, 2006 || Kitt Peak || Spacewatch ||  || align=right | 2.5 km || 
|-id=734 bgcolor=#fefefe
| 508734 ||  || — || October 20, 2007 || Mount Lemmon || Mount Lemmon Survey ||  || align=right data-sort-value="0.56" | 560 m || 
|-id=735 bgcolor=#E9E9E9
| 508735 ||  || — || November 11, 2004 || Kitt Peak || Spacewatch ||  || align=right | 1.9 km || 
|-id=736 bgcolor=#d6d6d6
| 508736 ||  || — || September 14, 2006 || Catalina || CSS ||  || align=right | 2.9 km || 
|-id=737 bgcolor=#fefefe
| 508737 ||  || — || December 15, 2006 || Kitt Peak || Spacewatch ||  || align=right data-sort-value="0.58" | 580 m || 
|-id=738 bgcolor=#fefefe
| 508738 ||  || — || September 16, 2003 || Kitt Peak || Spacewatch ||  || align=right data-sort-value="0.79" | 790 m || 
|-id=739 bgcolor=#fefefe
| 508739 ||  || — || June 30, 2005 || Kitt Peak || Spacewatch ||  || align=right data-sort-value="0.76" | 760 m || 
|-id=740 bgcolor=#fefefe
| 508740 ||  || — || October 20, 2006 || Kitt Peak || Spacewatch ||  || align=right data-sort-value="0.74" | 740 m || 
|-id=741 bgcolor=#E9E9E9
| 508741 ||  || — || September 9, 2004 || Kitt Peak || Spacewatch ||  || align=right | 1.4 km || 
|-id=742 bgcolor=#d6d6d6
| 508742 ||  || — || September 27, 2006 || Kitt Peak || Spacewatch ||  || align=right | 3.1 km || 
|-id=743 bgcolor=#E9E9E9
| 508743 ||  || — || September 18, 2003 || Kitt Peak || Spacewatch ||  || align=right | 3.8 km || 
|-id=744 bgcolor=#fefefe
| 508744 ||  || — || July 8, 2005 || Kitt Peak || Spacewatch ||  || align=right data-sort-value="0.75" | 750 m || 
|-id=745 bgcolor=#E9E9E9
| 508745 ||  || — || September 17, 2004 || Kitt Peak || Spacewatch ||  || align=right | 1.3 km || 
|-id=746 bgcolor=#E9E9E9
| 508746 ||  || — || August 26, 2000 || Socorro || LINEAR ||  || align=right data-sort-value="0.94" | 940 m || 
|-id=747 bgcolor=#fefefe
| 508747 ||  || — || August 28, 2006 || Catalina || CSS ||  || align=right data-sort-value="0.79" | 790 m || 
|-id=748 bgcolor=#d6d6d6
| 508748 ||  || — || October 27, 2006 || Catalina || CSS ||  || align=right | 3.6 km || 
|-id=749 bgcolor=#d6d6d6
| 508749 ||  || — || November 1, 2006 || Mount Lemmon || Mount Lemmon Survey ||  || align=right | 2.9 km || 
|-id=750 bgcolor=#d6d6d6
| 508750 ||  || — || November 17, 2006 || Kitt Peak || Spacewatch ||  || align=right | 3.5 km || 
|-id=751 bgcolor=#E9E9E9
| 508751 ||  || — || March 14, 2007 || Mount Lemmon || Mount Lemmon Survey ||  || align=right | 1.5 km || 
|-id=752 bgcolor=#E9E9E9
| 508752 ||  || — || October 6, 2004 || Kitt Peak || Spacewatch ||  || align=right | 1.3 km || 
|-id=753 bgcolor=#d6d6d6
| 508753 ||  || — || October 8, 1994 || Kitt Peak || Spacewatch ||  || align=right | 3.2 km || 
|-id=754 bgcolor=#E9E9E9
| 508754 ||  || — || September 28, 2003 || Kitt Peak || Spacewatch ||  || align=right | 2.3 km || 
|-id=755 bgcolor=#d6d6d6
| 508755 ||  || — || August 2, 2011 || Haleakala || Pan-STARRS ||  || align=right | 3.0 km || 
|-id=756 bgcolor=#fefefe
| 508756 ||  || — || January 8, 2006 || Kitt Peak || Spacewatch ||  || align=right data-sort-value="0.61" | 610 m || 
|-id=757 bgcolor=#d6d6d6
| 508757 ||  || — || April 4, 2003 || Kitt Peak || Spacewatch ||  || align=right | 4.4 km || 
|-id=758 bgcolor=#d6d6d6
| 508758 ||  || — || December 5, 2007 || Kitt Peak || Spacewatch ||  || align=right | 2.5 km || 
|-id=759 bgcolor=#d6d6d6
| 508759 ||  || — || December 30, 2007 || Kitt Peak || Spacewatch ||  || align=right | 3.2 km || 
|-id=760 bgcolor=#E9E9E9
| 508760 ||  || — || March 26, 2006 || Kitt Peak || Spacewatch ||  || align=right | 2.6 km || 
|-id=761 bgcolor=#E9E9E9
| 508761 ||  || — || November 29, 2005 || Kitt Peak || Spacewatch ||  || align=right data-sort-value="0.93" | 930 m || 
|-id=762 bgcolor=#E9E9E9
| 508762 ||  || — || January 19, 2005 || Kitt Peak || Spacewatch ||  || align=right | 2.2 km || 
|-id=763 bgcolor=#d6d6d6
| 508763 ||  || — || October 13, 2006 || Kitt Peak || Spacewatch ||  || align=right | 3.0 km || 
|-id=764 bgcolor=#fefefe
| 508764 ||  || — || December 11, 2004 || Kitt Peak || Spacewatch ||  || align=right data-sort-value="0.65" | 650 m || 
|-id=765 bgcolor=#FA8072
| 508765 ||  || — || September 24, 1960 || Palomar || PLS ||  || align=right data-sort-value="0.52" | 520 m || 
|-id=766 bgcolor=#fefefe
| 508766 ||  || — || November 5, 1991 || Kitt Peak || Spacewatch ||  || align=right data-sort-value="0.71" | 710 m || 
|-id=767 bgcolor=#FFC2E0
| 508767 ||  || — || January 22, 1993 || Kitt Peak || Spacewatch || AMO || align=right data-sort-value="0.78" | 780 m || 
|-id=768 bgcolor=#fefefe
| 508768 ||  || — || October 20, 1995 || Kitt Peak || Spacewatch || MAS || align=right data-sort-value="0.54" | 540 m || 
|-id=769 bgcolor=#fefefe
| 508769 ||  || — || November 15, 1995 || Kitt Peak || Spacewatch ||  || align=right data-sort-value="0.52" | 520 m || 
|-id=770 bgcolor=#C2E0FF
| 508770 ||  || — || November 18, 1995 || Mauna Kea || D. C. Jewitt, J. X. Luu || cubewano (cold)critical || align=right | 168 km || 
|-id=771 bgcolor=#E9E9E9
| 508771 ||  || — || May 10, 1997 || Mauna Kea || C. Veillet ||  || align=right | 2.0 km || 
|-id=772 bgcolor=#FFC2E0
| 508772 ||  || — || November 23, 1998 || Anderson Mesa || LONEOS || APO || align=right data-sort-value="0.38" | 380 m || 
|-id=773 bgcolor=#fefefe
| 508773 ||  || — || November 14, 1998 || Kitt Peak || Spacewatch || V || align=right data-sort-value="0.54" | 540 m || 
|-id=774 bgcolor=#FFC2E0
| 508774 ||  || — || May 7, 1999 || Catalina || CSS || APOPHA || align=right data-sort-value="0.40" | 400 m || 
|-id=775 bgcolor=#E9E9E9
| 508775 ||  || — || September 7, 1999 || Catalina || CSS || JUN || align=right data-sort-value="0.94" | 940 m || 
|-id=776 bgcolor=#FA8072
| 508776 ||  || — || September 8, 1999 || Socorro || LINEAR ||  || align=right | 1.6 km || 
|-id=777 bgcolor=#fefefe
| 508777 ||  || — || October 9, 1999 || Socorro || LINEAR ||  || align=right data-sort-value="0.67" | 670 m || 
|-id=778 bgcolor=#E9E9E9
| 508778 ||  || — || November 4, 1999 || Kitt Peak || Spacewatch ||  || align=right | 1.3 km || 
|-id=779 bgcolor=#FA8072
| 508779 ||  || — || November 4, 1999 || Catalina || CSS ||  || align=right data-sort-value="0.82" | 820 m || 
|-id=780 bgcolor=#E9E9E9
| 508780 ||  || — || November 10, 1999 || Kitt Peak || Spacewatch ||  || align=right data-sort-value="0.93" | 930 m || 
|-id=781 bgcolor=#E9E9E9
| 508781 ||  || — || November 11, 1999 || Kitt Peak || Spacewatch ||  || align=right | 1.3 km || 
|-id=782 bgcolor=#fefefe
| 508782 ||  || — || November 15, 1999 || Socorro || LINEAR ||  || align=right data-sort-value="0.65" | 650 m || 
|-id=783 bgcolor=#E9E9E9
| 508783 ||  || — || December 7, 1999 || Socorro || LINEAR ||  || align=right | 2.5 km || 
|-id=784 bgcolor=#FA8072
| 508784 ||  || — || December 7, 1999 || Socorro || LINEAR ||  || align=right | 1.0 km || 
|-id=785 bgcolor=#E9E9E9
| 508785 ||  || — || January 9, 2000 || Kitt Peak || Spacewatch ||  || align=right | 2.1 km || 
|-id=786 bgcolor=#FFC2E0
| 508786 ||  || — || January 30, 2000 || Catalina || CSS || APOcritical || align=right data-sort-value="0.37" | 370 m || 
|-id=787 bgcolor=#E9E9E9
| 508787 ||  || — || January 16, 2000 || Kitt Peak || Spacewatch ||  || align=right | 1.6 km || 
|-id=788 bgcolor=#C2E0FF
| 508788 ||  || — || February 6, 2000 || Kitt Peak || M. W. Buie || cubewano (cold)mooncritical || align=right | 202 km || 
|-id=789 bgcolor=#fefefe
| 508789 ||  || — || February 27, 2000 || Kitt Peak || Spacewatch || H || align=right data-sort-value="0.68" | 680 m || 
|-id=790 bgcolor=#fefefe
| 508790 ||  || — || March 3, 2000 || Kitt Peak || Spacewatch || MAS || align=right data-sort-value="0.59" | 590 m || 
|-id=791 bgcolor=#FA8072
| 508791 ||  || — || March 12, 2000 || Socorro || LINEAR ||  || align=right | 1.4 km || 
|-id=792 bgcolor=#C2E0FF
| 508792 ||  || — || March 31, 2000 || Mauna Kea || C. Trujillo, S. S. Sheppard, D. C. Jewitt || cubewano? || align=right | 122 km || 
|-id=793 bgcolor=#fefefe
| 508793 ||  || — || March 30, 2000 || Kitt Peak || Spacewatch ||  || align=right data-sort-value="0.79" | 790 m || 
|-id=794 bgcolor=#fefefe
| 508794 ||  || — || April 24, 2000 || Kitt Peak || Spacewatch ||  || align=right data-sort-value="0.62" | 620 m || 
|-id=795 bgcolor=#E9E9E9
| 508795 ||  || — || April 29, 2000 || Socorro || LINEAR ||  || align=right | 2.5 km || 
|-id=796 bgcolor=#FFC2E0
| 508796 ||  || — || May 30, 2000 || Anderson Mesa || LONEOS || AMOcritical || align=right data-sort-value="0.71" | 710 m || 
|-id=797 bgcolor=#fefefe
| 508797 ||  || — || August 3, 2000 || Bergisch Gladbach || W. Bickel ||  || align=right data-sort-value="0.73" | 730 m || 
|-id=798 bgcolor=#FA8072
| 508798 ||  || — || August 1, 2000 || Socorro || LINEAR ||  || align=right data-sort-value="0.77" | 770 m || 
|-id=799 bgcolor=#E9E9E9
| 508799 ||  || — || August 29, 2000 || Socorro || LINEAR ||  || align=right | 1.0 km || 
|-id=800 bgcolor=#E9E9E9
| 508800 ||  || — || September 24, 2000 || Socorro || LINEAR ||  || align=right | 1.1 km || 
|}

508801–508900 

|-bgcolor=#E9E9E9
| 508801 ||  || — || September 24, 2000 || Socorro || LINEAR ||  || align=right data-sort-value="0.98" | 980 m || 
|-id=802 bgcolor=#E9E9E9
| 508802 ||  || — || September 21, 2000 || Anderson Mesa || LONEOS ||  || align=right data-sort-value="0.80" | 800 m || 
|-id=803 bgcolor=#E9E9E9
| 508803 ||  || — || September 24, 2000 || Socorro || LINEAR ||  || align=right | 1.2 km || 
|-id=804 bgcolor=#d6d6d6
| 508804 ||  || — || October 1, 2000 || Socorro || LINEAR ||  || align=right | 3.4 km || 
|-id=805 bgcolor=#FA8072
| 508805 ||  || — || October 2, 2000 || Kitt Peak || Spacewatch ||  || align=right data-sort-value="0.82" | 820 m || 
|-id=806 bgcolor=#E9E9E9
| 508806 ||  || — || October 1, 2000 || Socorro || LINEAR ||  || align=right | 1.3 km || 
|-id=807 bgcolor=#E9E9E9
| 508807 ||  || — || October 24, 2000 || Socorro || LINEAR ||  || align=right | 1.2 km || 
|-id=808 bgcolor=#FA8072
| 508808 ||  || — || October 24, 2000 || Socorro || LINEAR ||  || align=right | 1.0 km || 
|-id=809 bgcolor=#E9E9E9
| 508809 ||  || — || October 24, 2000 || Socorro || LINEAR ||  || align=right | 1.1 km || 
|-id=810 bgcolor=#FA8072
| 508810 ||  || — || November 20, 2000 || Socorro || LINEAR ||  || align=right | 2.1 km || 
|-id=811 bgcolor=#E9E9E9
| 508811 ||  || — || November 19, 2000 || Socorro || LINEAR ||  || align=right | 1.2 km || 
|-id=812 bgcolor=#E9E9E9
| 508812 ||  || — || November 21, 2000 || Socorro || LINEAR || BAR || align=right | 1.1 km || 
|-id=813 bgcolor=#E9E9E9
| 508813 ||  || — || November 20, 2000 || Socorro || LINEAR ||  || align=right | 1.8 km || 
|-id=814 bgcolor=#E9E9E9
| 508814 ||  || — || November 27, 2000 || Socorro || LINEAR ||  || align=right data-sort-value="0.90" | 900 m || 
|-id=815 bgcolor=#FA8072
| 508815 ||  || — || December 1, 2000 || Socorro || LINEAR ||  || align=right data-sort-value="0.54" | 540 m || 
|-id=816 bgcolor=#E9E9E9
| 508816 ||  || — || December 4, 2000 || Socorro || LINEAR ||  || align=right | 1.1 km || 
|-id=817 bgcolor=#E9E9E9
| 508817 ||  || — || January 18, 2001 || Socorro || LINEAR ||  || align=right | 1.4 km || 
|-id=818 bgcolor=#FA8072
| 508818 ||  || — || February 16, 2001 || Višnjan || K. Korlević ||  || align=right | 1.9 km || 
|-id=819 bgcolor=#E9E9E9
| 508819 ||  || — || March 16, 2001 || Kitt Peak || Spacewatch ||  || align=right data-sort-value="0.89" | 890 m || 
|-id=820 bgcolor=#E9E9E9
| 508820 ||  || — || March 2, 2001 || Anderson Mesa || LONEOS ||  || align=right | 1.5 km || 
|-id=821 bgcolor=#FA8072
| 508821 ||  || — || September 10, 2001 || Socorro || LINEAR || H || align=right data-sort-value="0.68" | 680 m || 
|-id=822 bgcolor=#fefefe
| 508822 ||  || — || September 12, 2001 || Kitt Peak || Spacewatch ||  || align=right data-sort-value="0.56" | 560 m || 
|-id=823 bgcolor=#C2E0FF
| 508823 ||  || — || September 12, 2001 || Kitt Peak || M. W. Buie || plutino || align=right | 212 km || 
|-id=824 bgcolor=#fefefe
| 508824 ||  || — || September 12, 2001 || Socorro || LINEAR ||  || align=right | 1.2 km || 
|-id=825 bgcolor=#FA8072
| 508825 ||  || — || September 20, 2001 || Socorro || LINEAR || unusual || align=right | 1.8 km || 
|-id=826 bgcolor=#fefefe
| 508826 ||  || — || September 16, 2001 || Socorro || LINEAR ||  || align=right data-sort-value="0.78" | 780 m || 
|-id=827 bgcolor=#d6d6d6
| 508827 ||  || — || September 19, 2001 || Socorro || LINEAR ||  || align=right | 2.1 km || 
|-id=828 bgcolor=#fefefe
| 508828 ||  || — || September 19, 2001 || Socorro || LINEAR ||  || align=right data-sort-value="0.66" | 660 m || 
|-id=829 bgcolor=#fefefe
| 508829 ||  || — || August 27, 2001 || Anderson Mesa || LONEOS || H || align=right data-sort-value="0.71" | 710 m || 
|-id=830 bgcolor=#d6d6d6
| 508830 ||  || — || October 12, 2001 || Haleakala || NEAT ||  || align=right | 2.6 km || 
|-id=831 bgcolor=#fefefe
| 508831 ||  || — || October 17, 2001 || Nashville || R. Clingan || NYS || align=right data-sort-value="0.72" | 720 m || 
|-id=832 bgcolor=#fefefe
| 508832 ||  || — || October 21, 2001 || Kitt Peak || Spacewatch ||  || align=right data-sort-value="0.84" | 840 m || 
|-id=833 bgcolor=#fefefe
| 508833 ||  || — || October 14, 2001 || Kitt Peak || Spacewatch ||  || align=right data-sort-value="0.81" | 810 m || 
|-id=834 bgcolor=#fefefe
| 508834 ||  || — || October 11, 2001 || Kitt Peak || Spacewatch || H || align=right data-sort-value="0.76" | 760 m || 
|-id=835 bgcolor=#fefefe
| 508835 ||  || — || December 9, 2001 || Socorro || LINEAR || H || align=right data-sort-value="0.75" | 750 m || 
|-id=836 bgcolor=#d6d6d6
| 508836 ||  || — || November 16, 2001 || Kitt Peak || Spacewatch ||  || align=right | 4.4 km || 
|-id=837 bgcolor=#E9E9E9
| 508837 ||  || — || December 14, 2001 || Socorro || LINEAR ||  || align=right | 1.0 km || 
|-id=838 bgcolor=#E9E9E9
| 508838 ||  || — || January 9, 2002 || Socorro || LINEAR ||  || align=right | 2.8 km || 
|-id=839 bgcolor=#d6d6d6
| 508839 ||  || — || December 17, 2001 || Socorro || LINEAR ||  || align=right | 2.9 km || 
|-id=840 bgcolor=#E9E9E9
| 508840 ||  || — || January 9, 2002 || Socorro || LINEAR ||  || align=right | 1.3 km || 
|-id=841 bgcolor=#E9E9E9
| 508841 ||  || — || January 21, 2002 || Socorro || LINEAR ||  || align=right | 1.4 km || 
|-id=842 bgcolor=#d6d6d6
| 508842 ||  || — || January 19, 2002 || Kitt Peak || Spacewatch || 3:2 || align=right | 4.3 km || 
|-id=843 bgcolor=#fefefe
| 508843 ||  || — || February 10, 2002 || Socorro || LINEAR || H || align=right data-sort-value="0.82" | 820 m || 
|-id=844 bgcolor=#d6d6d6
| 508844 ||  || — || January 19, 2002 || Socorro || LINEAR ||  || align=right | 2.9 km || 
|-id=845 bgcolor=#d6d6d6
| 508845 ||  || — || February 7, 2002 || Socorro || LINEAR ||  || align=right | 3.1 km || 
|-id=846 bgcolor=#d6d6d6
| 508846 ||  || — || February 10, 2002 || Socorro || LINEAR ||  || align=right | 3.4 km || 
|-id=847 bgcolor=#d6d6d6
| 508847 ||  || — || February 10, 2002 || Socorro || LINEAR ||  || align=right | 3.1 km || 
|-id=848 bgcolor=#d6d6d6
| 508848 ||  || — || February 10, 2002 || Socorro || LINEAR ||  || align=right | 3.1 km || 
|-id=849 bgcolor=#E9E9E9
| 508849 ||  || — || February 8, 2002 || Kitt Peak || M. W. Buie ||  || align=right data-sort-value="0.64" | 640 m || 
|-id=850 bgcolor=#d6d6d6
| 508850 ||  || — || January 14, 2002 || Kitt Peak || Spacewatch ||  || align=right | 2.1 km || 
|-id=851 bgcolor=#E9E9E9
| 508851 ||  || — || February 10, 2002 || Socorro || LINEAR ||  || align=right data-sort-value="0.57" | 570 m || 
|-id=852 bgcolor=#fefefe
| 508852 ||  || — || March 13, 2002 || Socorro || LINEAR || H || align=right data-sort-value="0.80" | 800 m || 
|-id=853 bgcolor=#E9E9E9
| 508853 ||  || — || April 9, 2002 || Kitt Peak || Spacewatch ||  || align=right | 1.1 km || 
|-id=854 bgcolor=#C2FFFF
| 508854 ||  || — || April 14, 2002 || Kitt Peak || Spacewatch || L4 || align=right | 7.0 km || 
|-id=855 bgcolor=#E9E9E9
| 508855 ||  || — || May 7, 2002 || Palomar || NEAT ||  || align=right | 1.3 km || 
|-id=856 bgcolor=#fefefe
| 508856 ||  || — || June 10, 2002 || Palomar || NEAT ||  || align=right data-sort-value="0.96" | 960 m || 
|-id=857 bgcolor=#d6d6d6
| 508857 ||  || — || June 11, 2002 || Palomar || NEAT ||  || align=right | 2.5 km || 
|-id=858 bgcolor=#FA8072
| 508858 ||  || — || August 13, 2002 || Kitt Peak || Spacewatch ||  || align=right data-sort-value="0.63" | 630 m || 
|-id=859 bgcolor=#fefefe
| 508859 ||  || — || August 16, 2002 || Kitt Peak || Spacewatch ||  || align=right data-sort-value="0.74" | 740 m || 
|-id=860 bgcolor=#d6d6d6
| 508860 ||  || — || September 5, 2002 || Anderson Mesa || LONEOS || Tj (2.94) || align=right | 5.1 km || 
|-id=861 bgcolor=#FFC2E0
| 508861 ||  || — || September 5, 2002 || Anderson Mesa || LONEOS || AMO +1kmcritical || align=right | 1.2 km || 
|-id=862 bgcolor=#fefefe
| 508862 ||  || — || September 5, 2002 || Socorro || LINEAR ||  || align=right data-sort-value="0.73" | 730 m || 
|-id=863 bgcolor=#E9E9E9
| 508863 ||  || — || September 4, 2002 || Palomar || NEAT ||  || align=right | 1.5 km || 
|-id=864 bgcolor=#fefefe
| 508864 ||  || — || September 5, 2002 || Socorro || LINEAR ||  || align=right data-sort-value="0.83" | 830 m || 
|-id=865 bgcolor=#E9E9E9
| 508865 ||  || — || October 4, 2002 || Apache Point || SDSS ||  || align=right | 1.7 km || 
|-id=866 bgcolor=#fefefe
| 508866 ||  || — || October 29, 2002 || Apache Point || SDSS ||  || align=right data-sort-value="0.62" | 620 m || 
|-id=867 bgcolor=#fefefe
| 508867 ||  || — || November 7, 2002 || Socorro || LINEAR ||  || align=right data-sort-value="0.82" | 820 m || 
|-id=868 bgcolor=#d6d6d6
| 508868 ||  || — || November 8, 2002 || Socorro || LINEAR ||  || align=right | 2.3 km || 
|-id=869 bgcolor=#C2E0FF
| 508869 ||  || — || November 7, 2002 || Kitt Peak || M. W. Buie || cubewano (cold)moon || align=right | 321 km || 
|-id=870 bgcolor=#fefefe
| 508870 ||  || — || December 10, 2002 || Palomar || NEAT || H || align=right data-sort-value="0.52" | 520 m || 
|-id=871 bgcolor=#FFC2E0
| 508871 ||  || — || February 8, 2003 || Haleakala || NEAT || APO || align=right data-sort-value="0.59" | 590 m || 
|-id=872 bgcolor=#d6d6d6
| 508872 ||  || — || February 4, 2003 || Anderson Mesa || LONEOS ||  || align=right | 2.0 km || 
|-id=873 bgcolor=#d6d6d6
| 508873 ||  || — || March 25, 2003 || Palomar || NEAT ||  || align=right | 2.0 km || 
|-id=874 bgcolor=#fefefe
| 508874 ||  || — || March 27, 2003 || Kitt Peak || Spacewatch ||  || align=right | 1.1 km || 
|-id=875 bgcolor=#d6d6d6
| 508875 ||  || — || March 27, 2003 || Anderson Mesa || LONEOS ||  || align=right | 3.9 km || 
|-id=876 bgcolor=#d6d6d6
| 508876 ||  || — || April 29, 2003 || Kitt Peak || Spacewatch ||  || align=right | 3.2 km || 
|-id=877 bgcolor=#d6d6d6
| 508877 ||  || — || May 27, 2003 || Anderson Mesa || LONEOS ||  || align=right | 2.3 km || 
|-id=878 bgcolor=#fefefe
| 508878 ||  || — || June 3, 2003 || Kitt Peak || Spacewatch || H || align=right data-sort-value="0.62" | 620 m || 
|-id=879 bgcolor=#E9E9E9
| 508879 ||  || — || September 17, 2003 || Socorro || LINEAR ||  || align=right | 1.5 km || 
|-id=880 bgcolor=#E9E9E9
| 508880 ||  || — || September 17, 2003 || Kitt Peak || Spacewatch ||  || align=right | 1.5 km || 
|-id=881 bgcolor=#FA8072
| 508881 ||  || — || September 17, 2003 || Campo Imperatore || CINEOS ||  || align=right data-sort-value="0.81" | 810 m || 
|-id=882 bgcolor=#fefefe
| 508882 ||  || — || September 24, 2003 || Haleakala || NEAT ||  || align=right data-sort-value="0.81" | 810 m || 
|-id=883 bgcolor=#fefefe
| 508883 ||  || — || September 18, 2003 || Socorro || LINEAR ||  || align=right data-sort-value="0.60" | 600 m || 
|-id=884 bgcolor=#E9E9E9
| 508884 ||  || — || September 16, 2003 || Kitt Peak || Spacewatch ||  || align=right | 1.6 km || 
|-id=885 bgcolor=#d6d6d6
| 508885 ||  || — || September 29, 2003 || Kitt Peak || Spacewatch || 3:2 || align=right | 3.4 km || 
|-id=886 bgcolor=#fefefe
| 508886 ||  || — || September 17, 2003 || Kitt Peak || Spacewatch ||  || align=right data-sort-value="0.65" | 650 m || 
|-id=887 bgcolor=#E9E9E9
| 508887 ||  || — || September 30, 2003 || Socorro || LINEAR ||  || align=right | 1.1 km || 
|-id=888 bgcolor=#E9E9E9
| 508888 ||  || — || September 17, 2003 || Kitt Peak || Spacewatch ||  || align=right | 1.7 km || 
|-id=889 bgcolor=#fefefe
| 508889 ||  || — || September 27, 2003 || Kitt Peak || Spacewatch ||  || align=right data-sort-value="0.51" | 510 m || 
|-id=890 bgcolor=#fefefe
| 508890 ||  || — || September 18, 2003 || Kitt Peak || Spacewatch ||  || align=right data-sort-value="0.47" | 470 m || 
|-id=891 bgcolor=#E9E9E9
| 508891 ||  || — || September 18, 2003 || Kitt Peak || Spacewatch ||  || align=right | 1.3 km || 
|-id=892 bgcolor=#fefefe
| 508892 ||  || — || October 1, 2003 || Kitt Peak || Spacewatch ||  || align=right data-sort-value="0.55" | 550 m || 
|-id=893 bgcolor=#E9E9E9
| 508893 ||  || — || September 30, 2003 || Socorro || LINEAR ||  || align=right | 2.3 km || 
|-id=894 bgcolor=#E9E9E9
| 508894 ||  || — || October 16, 2003 || Kitt Peak || Spacewatch ||  || align=right | 2.0 km || 
|-id=895 bgcolor=#E9E9E9
| 508895 ||  || — || September 21, 2003 || Anderson Mesa || LONEOS || ADE || align=right | 2.0 km || 
|-id=896 bgcolor=#E9E9E9
| 508896 ||  || — || September 28, 2003 || Kitt Peak || Spacewatch || ADE || align=right | 1.9 km || 
|-id=897 bgcolor=#fefefe
| 508897 ||  || — || October 1, 2003 || Kitt Peak || Spacewatch ||  || align=right data-sort-value="0.56" | 560 m || 
|-id=898 bgcolor=#E9E9E9
| 508898 ||  || — || September 22, 2003 || Kitt Peak || Spacewatch ||  || align=right | 1.7 km || 
|-id=899 bgcolor=#E9E9E9
| 508899 ||  || — || October 22, 2003 || Socorro || LINEAR ||  || align=right | 2.8 km || 
|-id=900 bgcolor=#E9E9E9
| 508900 ||  || — || September 19, 2003 || Kitt Peak || Spacewatch || MRX || align=right data-sort-value="0.85" | 850 m || 
|}

508901–509000 

|-bgcolor=#E9E9E9
| 508901 ||  || — || October 18, 2003 || Kitt Peak || Spacewatch ||  || align=right | 2.2 km || 
|-id=902 bgcolor=#fefefe
| 508902 ||  || — || November 19, 2003 || Socorro || LINEAR || H || align=right data-sort-value="0.85" | 850 m || 
|-id=903 bgcolor=#fefefe
| 508903 ||  || — || November 20, 2003 || Socorro || LINEAR ||  || align=right | 1.1 km || 
|-id=904 bgcolor=#E9E9E9
| 508904 ||  || — || November 18, 2003 || Kitt Peak || Spacewatch || EUN || align=right | 1.1 km || 
|-id=905 bgcolor=#FFC2E0
| 508905 ||  || — || November 21, 2003 || Anderson Mesa || LONEOS || AMO +1km || align=right data-sort-value="0.84" | 840 m || 
|-id=906 bgcolor=#E9E9E9
| 508906 ||  || — || November 20, 2003 || Kitt Peak || Spacewatch ||  || align=right | 1.7 km || 
|-id=907 bgcolor=#FA8072
| 508907 ||  || — || December 5, 2003 || Socorro || LINEAR ||  || align=right | 1.2 km || 
|-id=908 bgcolor=#FFC2E0
| 508908 ||  || — || December 19, 2003 || Catalina || CSS || ATEPHA || align=right data-sort-value="0.23" | 230 m || 
|-id=909 bgcolor=#E9E9E9
| 508909 ||  || — || December 18, 2003 || Socorro || LINEAR ||  || align=right | 2.2 km || 
|-id=910 bgcolor=#fefefe
| 508910 ||  || — || November 21, 2003 || Socorro || LINEAR ||  || align=right data-sort-value="0.77" | 770 m || 
|-id=911 bgcolor=#E9E9E9
| 508911 ||  || — || October 29, 2003 || Socorro || LINEAR ||  || align=right | 1.9 km || 
|-id=912 bgcolor=#FFC2E0
| 508912 ||  || — || January 16, 2004 || Catalina || CSS || APOcritical || align=right data-sort-value="0.45" | 450 m || 
|-id=913 bgcolor=#fefefe
| 508913 ||  || — || December 18, 2003 || Kitt Peak || Spacewatch ||  || align=right data-sort-value="0.68" | 680 m || 
|-id=914 bgcolor=#E9E9E9
| 508914 ||  || — || January 16, 2004 || Anderson Mesa || LONEOS ||  || align=right | 2.3 km || 
|-id=915 bgcolor=#fefefe
| 508915 ||  || — || January 21, 2004 || Socorro || LINEAR || PHO || align=right | 1.1 km || 
|-id=916 bgcolor=#fefefe
| 508916 ||  || — || January 28, 2004 || Kitt Peak || Spacewatch || H || align=right data-sort-value="0.74" | 740 m || 
|-id=917 bgcolor=#fefefe
| 508917 ||  || — || January 23, 2004 || Socorro || LINEAR || PHO || align=right data-sort-value="0.72" | 720 m || 
|-id=918 bgcolor=#FFC2E0
| 508918 ||  || — || January 28, 2004 || Socorro || LINEAR || APOcritical || align=right data-sort-value="0.51" | 510 m || 
|-id=919 bgcolor=#fefefe
| 508919 ||  || — || February 12, 2004 || Kitt Peak || Spacewatch || H || align=right data-sort-value="0.91" | 910 m || 
|-id=920 bgcolor=#E9E9E9
| 508920 ||  || — || January 28, 2004 || Kitt Peak || Spacewatch ||  || align=right | 2.7 km || 
|-id=921 bgcolor=#fefefe
| 508921 ||  || — || March 12, 2004 || Palomar || NEAT ||  || align=right data-sort-value="0.79" | 790 m || 
|-id=922 bgcolor=#d6d6d6
| 508922 ||  || — || March 15, 2004 || Kitt Peak || Spacewatch || 3:2 || align=right | 3.4 km || 
|-id=923 bgcolor=#fefefe
| 508923 ||  || — || March 16, 2004 || Socorro || LINEAR || H || align=right data-sort-value="0.67" | 670 m || 
|-id=924 bgcolor=#fefefe
| 508924 ||  || — || January 28, 2000 || Kitt Peak || Spacewatch ||  || align=right data-sort-value="0.75" | 750 m || 
|-id=925 bgcolor=#fefefe
| 508925 ||  || — || March 16, 2004 || Socorro || LINEAR ||  || align=right data-sort-value="0.88" | 880 m || 
|-id=926 bgcolor=#E9E9E9
| 508926 ||  || — || March 22, 2004 || Socorro || LINEAR ||  || align=right | 2.0 km || 
|-id=927 bgcolor=#fefefe
| 508927 ||  || — || February 11, 2004 || Socorro || LINEAR ||  || align=right | 1.1 km || 
|-id=928 bgcolor=#fefefe
| 508928 ||  || — || March 22, 2004 || Anderson Mesa || LONEOS ||  || align=right data-sort-value="0.98" | 980 m || 
|-id=929 bgcolor=#fefefe
| 508929 ||  || — || March 29, 2004 || Catalina || CSS ||  || align=right data-sort-value="0.94" | 940 m || 
|-id=930 bgcolor=#E9E9E9
| 508930 ||  || — || April 13, 2004 || Socorro || LINEAR || PAL || align=right | 1.8 km || 
|-id=931 bgcolor=#fefefe
| 508931 ||  || — || April 25, 2004 || Anderson Mesa || LONEOS ||  || align=right data-sort-value="0.72" | 720 m || 
|-id=932 bgcolor=#FA8072
| 508932 ||  || — || May 13, 2004 || Socorro || LINEAR ||  || align=right data-sort-value="0.94" | 940 m || 
|-id=933 bgcolor=#FA8072
| 508933 ||  || — || July 16, 2004 || Siding Spring || SSS || H || align=right data-sort-value="0.60" | 600 m || 
|-id=934 bgcolor=#E9E9E9
| 508934 ||  || — || September 7, 2004 || Socorro || LINEAR ||  || align=right data-sort-value="0.91" | 910 m || 
|-id=935 bgcolor=#E9E9E9
| 508935 ||  || — || September 8, 2004 || Socorro || LINEAR ||  || align=right | 1.7 km || 
|-id=936 bgcolor=#E9E9E9
| 508936 ||  || — || September 8, 2004 || Socorro || LINEAR ||  || align=right data-sort-value="0.80" | 800 m || 
|-id=937 bgcolor=#E9E9E9
| 508937 ||  || — || August 25, 2004 || Kitt Peak || Spacewatch ||  || align=right data-sort-value="0.98" | 980 m || 
|-id=938 bgcolor=#E9E9E9
| 508938 ||  || — || August 25, 2004 || Kitt Peak || Spacewatch ||  || align=right | 1.2 km || 
|-id=939 bgcolor=#E9E9E9
| 508939 ||  || — || September 9, 2004 || Socorro || LINEAR ||  || align=right | 1.3 km || 
|-id=940 bgcolor=#FA8072
| 508940 ||  || — || September 13, 2004 || Socorro || LINEAR ||  || align=right data-sort-value="0.77" | 770 m || 
|-id=941 bgcolor=#E9E9E9
| 508941 ||  || — || September 11, 2004 || Socorro || LINEAR ||  || align=right | 1.3 km || 
|-id=942 bgcolor=#E9E9E9
| 508942 ||  || — || September 13, 2004 || Socorro || LINEAR ||  || align=right | 1.1 km || 
|-id=943 bgcolor=#E9E9E9
| 508943 ||  || — || September 15, 2004 || Anderson Mesa || LONEOS || EUN || align=right | 1.1 km || 
|-id=944 bgcolor=#FA8072
| 508944 ||  || — || September 15, 2004 || Socorro || LINEAR || H || align=right data-sort-value="0.64" | 640 m || 
|-id=945 bgcolor=#E9E9E9
| 508945 ||  || — || September 10, 2004 || Socorro || LINEAR ||  || align=right data-sort-value="0.95" | 950 m || 
|-id=946 bgcolor=#E9E9E9
| 508946 ||  || — || September 10, 2004 || Kitt Peak || Spacewatch ||  || align=right data-sort-value="0.99" | 990 m || 
|-id=947 bgcolor=#d6d6d6
| 508947 ||  || — || September 16, 2004 || Socorro || LINEAR || Tj (2.99) || align=right | 3.8 km || 
|-id=948 bgcolor=#E9E9E9
| 508948 ||  || — || September 17, 2004 || Anderson Mesa || LONEOS ||  || align=right data-sort-value="0.98" | 980 m || 
|-id=949 bgcolor=#E9E9E9
| 508949 ||  || — || September 17, 2004 || Socorro || LINEAR ||  || align=right data-sort-value="0.96" | 960 m || 
|-id=950 bgcolor=#E9E9E9
| 508950 ||  || — || September 13, 2004 || Socorro || LINEAR ||  || align=right | 1.1 km || 
|-id=951 bgcolor=#FA8072
| 508951 ||  || — || October 13, 2004 || Siding Spring || SSS ||  || align=right data-sort-value="0.87" | 870 m || 
|-id=952 bgcolor=#E9E9E9
| 508952 ||  || — || September 17, 2004 || Kitt Peak || Spacewatch ||  || align=right | 1.3 km || 
|-id=953 bgcolor=#E9E9E9
| 508953 ||  || — || October 4, 2004 || Kitt Peak || Spacewatch || KON || align=right | 1.8 km || 
|-id=954 bgcolor=#E9E9E9
| 508954 ||  || — || October 4, 2004 || Kitt Peak || Spacewatch ||  || align=right | 1.5 km || 
|-id=955 bgcolor=#E9E9E9
| 508955 ||  || — || October 7, 2004 || Anderson Mesa || LONEOS ||  || align=right data-sort-value="0.86" | 860 m || 
|-id=956 bgcolor=#E9E9E9
| 508956 ||  || — || October 7, 2004 || Socorro || LINEAR ||  || align=right | 1.7 km || 
|-id=957 bgcolor=#E9E9E9
| 508957 ||  || — || September 15, 2004 || Kitt Peak || Spacewatch || MAR || align=right data-sort-value="0.97" | 970 m || 
|-id=958 bgcolor=#E9E9E9
| 508958 ||  || — || October 6, 2004 || Kitt Peak || Spacewatch ||  || align=right data-sort-value="0.74" | 740 m || 
|-id=959 bgcolor=#E9E9E9
| 508959 ||  || — || September 24, 2004 || Kitt Peak || Spacewatch ||  || align=right data-sort-value="0.68" | 680 m || 
|-id=960 bgcolor=#E9E9E9
| 508960 ||  || — || October 7, 2004 || Kitt Peak || Spacewatch ||  || align=right | 1.2 km || 
|-id=961 bgcolor=#E9E9E9
| 508961 ||  || — || September 11, 2004 || Socorro || LINEAR ||  || align=right | 1.4 km || 
|-id=962 bgcolor=#fefefe
| 508962 ||  || — || October 9, 2004 || Kitt Peak || Spacewatch ||  || align=right data-sort-value="0.44" | 440 m || 
|-id=963 bgcolor=#E9E9E9
| 508963 ||  || — || October 11, 2004 || Kitt Peak || Spacewatch ||  || align=right | 1.3 km || 
|-id=964 bgcolor=#E9E9E9
| 508964 ||  || — || October 11, 2004 || Kitt Peak || Spacewatch ||  || align=right | 1.3 km || 
|-id=965 bgcolor=#E9E9E9
| 508965 ||  || — || October 9, 2004 || Kitt Peak || Spacewatch ||  || align=right data-sort-value="0.73" | 730 m || 
|-id=966 bgcolor=#E9E9E9
| 508966 ||  || — || October 16, 2004 || Socorro || LINEAR ||  || align=right | 1.4 km || 
|-id=967 bgcolor=#FFC2E0
| 508967 ||  || — || November 7, 2004 || Socorro || LINEAR || APOPHAcritical || align=right data-sort-value="0.74" | 740 m || 
|-id=968 bgcolor=#fefefe
| 508968 ||  || — || November 9, 2004 || Catalina || CSS || H || align=right data-sort-value="0.69" | 690 m || 
|-id=969 bgcolor=#E9E9E9
| 508969 ||  || — || November 10, 2004 || Kitt Peak || Spacewatch ||  || align=right | 1.1 km || 
|-id=970 bgcolor=#E9E9E9
| 508970 ||  || — || November 11, 2004 || Kitt Peak || Spacewatch ||  || align=right data-sort-value="0.88" | 880 m || 
|-id=971 bgcolor=#fefefe
| 508971 ||  || — || November 9, 2004 || Mauna Kea || C. Veillet ||  || align=right data-sort-value="0.54" | 540 m || 
|-id=972 bgcolor=#E9E9E9
| 508972 ||  || — || November 9, 2004 || Catalina || CSS ||  || align=right | 1.5 km || 
|-id=973 bgcolor=#E9E9E9
| 508973 ||  || — || December 2, 2004 || Kitt Peak || Spacewatch ||  || align=right | 1.4 km || 
|-id=974 bgcolor=#E9E9E9
| 508974 ||  || — || December 10, 2004 || Socorro || LINEAR ||  || align=right | 2.4 km || 
|-id=975 bgcolor=#E9E9E9
| 508975 ||  || — || December 14, 2004 || Kitt Peak || Spacewatch ||  || align=right | 1.3 km || 
|-id=976 bgcolor=#C2FFFF
| 508976 ||  || — || December 14, 2004 || Kitt Peak || Spacewatch || L5 || align=right | 11 km || 
|-id=977 bgcolor=#fefefe
| 508977 ||  || — || December 9, 2004 || Catalina || CSS || H || align=right | 1.00 km || 
|-id=978 bgcolor=#fefefe
| 508978 ||  || — || December 10, 2004 || Kitt Peak || Spacewatch || H || align=right data-sort-value="0.52" | 520 m || 
|-id=979 bgcolor=#fefefe
| 508979 ||  || — || December 2, 2004 || Kitt Peak || Spacewatch || H || align=right data-sort-value="0.65" | 650 m || 
|-id=980 bgcolor=#fefefe
| 508980 ||  || — || January 11, 2005 || Socorro || LINEAR || H || align=right data-sort-value="0.64" | 640 m || 
|-id=981 bgcolor=#E9E9E9
| 508981 ||  || — || January 15, 2005 || Socorro || LINEAR ||  || align=right | 2.1 km || 
|-id=982 bgcolor=#fefefe
| 508982 ||  || — || January 13, 2005 || Catalina || CSS || H || align=right data-sort-value="0.69" | 690 m || 
|-id=983 bgcolor=#E9E9E9
| 508983 ||  || — || February 2, 2005 || Socorro || LINEAR || JUN || align=right | 1.1 km || 
|-id=984 bgcolor=#E9E9E9
| 508984 ||  || — || March 7, 2005 || Socorro || LINEAR ||  || align=right | 2.4 km || 
|-id=985 bgcolor=#FA8072
| 508985 ||  || — || December 15, 2004 || Catalina || CSS ||  || align=right | 1.4 km || 
|-id=986 bgcolor=#E9E9E9
| 508986 ||  || — || February 1, 2005 || Kitt Peak || Spacewatch ||  || align=right | 1.8 km || 
|-id=987 bgcolor=#FA8072
| 508987 ||  || — || March 9, 2005 || Catalina || CSS ||  || align=right data-sort-value="0.82" | 820 m || 
|-id=988 bgcolor=#E9E9E9
| 508988 ||  || — || November 18, 2003 || Kitt Peak || Spacewatch ||  || align=right | 2.2 km || 
|-id=989 bgcolor=#E9E9E9
| 508989 ||  || — || February 28, 2005 || Catalina || CSS ||  || align=right | 1.3 km || 
|-id=990 bgcolor=#fefefe
| 508990 ||  || — || March 9, 2005 || Catalina || CSS || H || align=right data-sort-value="0.68" | 680 m || 
|-id=991 bgcolor=#E9E9E9
| 508991 ||  || — || March 11, 2005 || Kitt Peak || Spacewatch ||  || align=right | 1.9 km || 
|-id=992 bgcolor=#E9E9E9
| 508992 ||  || — || March 9, 2005 || Mount Lemmon || Mount Lemmon Survey ||  || align=right | 1.9 km || 
|-id=993 bgcolor=#fefefe
| 508993 ||  || — || March 14, 2005 || Socorro || LINEAR || H || align=right data-sort-value="0.65" | 650 m || 
|-id=994 bgcolor=#FA8072
| 508994 ||  || — || March 10, 2005 || Anderson Mesa || LONEOS || H || align=right data-sort-value="0.67" | 670 m || 
|-id=995 bgcolor=#d6d6d6
| 508995 ||  || — || March 13, 2005 || Catalina || CSS ||  || align=right | 2.4 km || 
|-id=996 bgcolor=#fefefe
| 508996 ||  || — || March 11, 2005 || Mount Lemmon || Mount Lemmon Survey ||  || align=right data-sort-value="0.54" | 540 m || 
|-id=997 bgcolor=#FFC2E0
| 508997 ||  || — || March 30, 2005 || Socorro || LINEAR || APO +1km || align=right | 1.4 km || 
|-id=998 bgcolor=#E9E9E9
| 508998 ||  || — || April 1, 2005 || Anderson Mesa || LONEOS ||  || align=right | 2.2 km || 
|-id=999 bgcolor=#E9E9E9
| 508999 ||  || — || April 2, 2005 || Mount Lemmon || Mount Lemmon Survey ||  || align=right | 1.7 km || 
|-id=000 bgcolor=#fefefe
| 509000 ||  || — || April 4, 2005 || Mount Lemmon || Mount Lemmon Survey ||  || align=right data-sort-value="0.82" | 820 m || 
|}

References

External links 
 Discovery Circumstances: Numbered Minor Planets (505001)–(510000) (IAU Minor Planet Center)

0508